

Deaths in May

 3: Florencio Campomanes
 4: Ernie Harwell
 6: Robin Roberts
 12: Charlie Francis

Current sporting seasons

Australian rules football 2010

Australian Football League

Auto racing 2010

Formula One
Sprint Cup

IRL IndyCar Series
World Rally Championship
Formula Two
Nationwide Series
Camping World Truck Series
GP2 Series
GP3 Series
WTTC
V8 Supercar
American Le Mans
Le Mans Series

Superleague Formula
Rolex Sports Car Series
FIA GT1 World Championship
Formula Three
Auto GP
World Series by Renault
Deutsche Tourenwagen Masters
Super GT

Baseball 2010

Major League Baseball
Nippon Professional Baseball

Basketball 2010

NBA
WNBA

France
Germany
Greece

Italy
Philippines
Fiesta Conference

Turkey

Cricket 2009–2010

Bangladesh:
National League

England:
County Championship

India:
Ranji Trophy

New Zealand:
Plunket Shield
Pakistan:
Quaid-i-Azam Trophy
South Africa:
SuperSport Series
Sri Lanka:
Premier Trophy

Zimbabwe:
Logan Cup

Association football 2010

National teams competitions

2011 FIFA Women's World Cup qualification (UEFA)
2011 UEFA European Under-21 Championship qualification

International clubs competitions

Copa Libertadores (South America)

AFC (Asia) Champions League
AFC Cup
CAF (Africa) Champions League
CAF Confederation Cup

Domestic (national) competitions

Brazil

Iran

Japan
Norway
Russia

Major League Soccer (USA & Canada)
Women's Professional Soccer (USA)

Golf 2010

PGA Tour
European Tour
LPGA Tour
Champions Tour

Ice hockey 2010

National Hockey League

Motorcycle racing 2010

Moto GP
Superbike World Championship
Supersport racing

Rugby league 2010

Super League
NRL

Rugby union 2010

2011 Rugby World Cup qualifying

Days of the month

May 31, 2010 (Monday)

Basketball
 Ukrainian SuperLeague Final (best-of-5 series):
Game 5: Budivelnyk Kyiv 70–77 Azovmash Mariupol. Azovmash Mariupol win series 3–2.
Azovmash Mariupol win the championship for the fifth consecutive time and seventh time overall.

Cricket
Bangladesh in England:
1st Test in London, day 5:
 505 (125 overs) and 163/2 (35.1 overs);  282 (93 overs) and 382 (f/o, 110.2 overs). England win by 8 wickets, lead the 2-match series 1–0.

Ice hockey
Stanley Cup Finals (best-of-7 series):
Game 2: Chicago Blackhawks 2, Philadelphia Flyers 1. Blackhawks lead series 2–0.

Motorcycle racing
Superbike:
Miller Superbike World Championship round in Tooele, United States:
Race 1: (1) Max Biaggi  (Aprilia RSV 4) (2) Leon Haslam  (Suzuki GSX-R1000) (3) Noriyuki Haga  (Ducati 1098R)
Race 2: (1) Biaggi (2) Leon Camier  (Aprilia RSV 4) (3) Cal Crutchlow  (Yamaha YZF-R1)
Riders' championship standings (after 7 of 13 rounds): (1) Biaggi 257 points (2) Haslam 242 (3) Jonathan Rea  (Honda CBR1000RR) 151
Manufacturers' championship standings: (1) Aprilia 263 points (2) Suzuki 252 (3) Ducati 214
Supersport:
Miller Supersport World Championship round in Tooele, United States:
(1) Kenan Sofuoğlu  (Honda CBR600RR) (2) Eugene Laverty  (Honda CBR600RR) (3) Joan Lascorz  (Kawasaki Ninja ZX-6R)
Riders' championship standings (after 7 of 13 rounds): (1) Sofuoğlu 142 points (2) Laverty 136 (3) Lascorz 128
Manufacturers' championship standings: (1) Honda 170 points (2) Kawasaki 128 (3) Triumph 94
Sofuoğlu achieves a hat-trick, as he won the race from pole position as well as setting the fastest lap.

Tennis
Grand Slams:
French Open in Paris, France:
Men's singles, fourth round:
Rafael Nadal  [2] def. Thomaz Bellucci  [24] 6–2, 7–5, 6–4
Novak Djokovic  [3] def. Robby Ginepri  6–4, 2–6, 6–1, 6–2
Nicolás Almagro  [19] def. Fernando Verdasco  [7] 6–1, 4–6, 6–1, 6–4
Jürgen Melzer  [22] def. Teymuraz Gabashvili  7–6(6), 4–6, 6–1, 6–4
Women's singles, fourth round:
Serena Williams  [1] def. Shahar Pe'er  [18] 6–2, 6–2
Jelena Janković  [4] def. Daniela Hantuchová  [23] 6–4, 6–2
Samantha Stosur  [7] def. Justine Henin  [22] 2–6, 6–1, 6–4
Yaroslava Shvedova  def. Jarmila Groth  [WC] 6–4, 6–3

May 30, 2010 (Sunday)

Auto racing
Formula One:
Turkish Grand Prix in Istanbul, Turkey:
(1) Lewis Hamilton  (McLaren–Mercedes) (2) Jenson Button  (McLaren-Mercedes) (3) Mark Webber  (Red Bull–Renault)
Drivers' championship standings (after 7 of 19 races): (1) Webber 93 points (2) Button 88 (3) Hamilton 84
Constructors' championship standings: (1) McLaren 172 points (2) Red Bull 171 (3) Ferrari 146
NASCAR Sprint Cup Series:
Coca-Cola 600 in Concord, North Carolina:
(1)  Kurt Busch (Dodge, Penske Racing) (2)  Jamie McMurray (Chevrolet, Earnhardt Ganassi Racing) (3)  Kyle Busch (Toyota, Joe Gibbs Racing)
Drivers' championship standings (after 13 of 36 races): (1)  Kevin Harvick (Chevrolet, Richard Childress Racing) 1898 points (2) Kyle Busch 1869 (3)  Matt Kenseth (Ford, Roush Fenway Racing) 1781
IndyCar Series:
Indianapolis 500 in Speedway, Indiana:
(1) Dario Franchitti  (Chip Ganassi Racing) (2) Dan Wheldon  (Panther Racing) (3) Marco Andretti  (Andretti Autosport)
Drivers' championship standings (after 6 of 17 races): (1) Will Power  (Team Penske) 227 points (2) Franchitti 216 (3) Scott Dixon  (Chip Ganassi Racing) 203
Owner Chip Ganassi becomes the first owner to win both the Daytona 500 and the Indianapolis 500 in the same season, with Franchitti becoming the 17th driver to win multiple Indy 500s.
World Rally Championship:
Rally de Portugal in Vilamoura:
(1) Sébastien Ogier  / Julien Ingrassia  (Citroën C4 WRC) (2) Sébastien Loeb  / Daniel Elena  (Citroën C4 WRC) (3) Dani Sordo  / Marc Martí  (Citroën C4 WRC)
Drivers' championship standings (after 6 of 13 rounds): (1) Loeb 126 points (2) Ogier 88 (3) Mikko Hirvonen  (Ford Focus RS WRC 09) 76

Basketball
FIBA Asia Champions Cup in Doha, Qatar:
Bronze Medal Match: ASU  78–82 (OT)   Al-Riyadi Beirut
Gold Medal Match:  Al-Rayyan  73–93   Mahram Tehran
Mahram Tehran win the Cup for the second successive year.
 Turkish Basketball League Finals (best-of-7 series):
Game 5: Efes Pilsen 83–79 Fenerbahçe Ülker. Fenerbahçe Ülker lead series 3–2.
 A1 Ethniki Final (best-of-5 series):
Game 2: Olympiacos 79–72 Panathinaikos. Series tied 1–1.
 Österreichische Basketball Bundesliga Final (best-of-5 series):
Game 5: Fürstenfeld 68–76 Gmunden. Gmunden win series 3–2.
Gmunden win the championship for the fifth time in six seasons.
 Novo Basquete Brasil Finals (best-of-5 series):
Game 3: Universo/BRB 85–84 Flamengo. Universo lead series 2–1.

Cricket
Bangladesh in England:
1st Test in London, day 4:
 505 (125 overs);  282 (93 overs) and 328/5 (f/o, 85 overs; Tamim Iqbal 103). Bangladesh lead by 105 runs with 5 wickets remaining.
South Africa in West Indies:
4th ODI in Roseau, Dominica:
 303/6 (50 overs);  304/3 (50 overs; Hashim Amla 129). South Africa win by 7 wickets; lead 5-match series 4–0.
Tri-nation series in Zimbabwe:
Group stage:
 242 (49.5 overs);  243/3 (43.3 overs, Rohit Sharma 101*) in Bulawayo. India win by 7 wickets.
Standings:  4 points (1 match), India 4 (2), Sri Lanka 0 (1).

Cycling
Grand Tours:
Giro d'Italia:
Stage 21:  Gustav Larsson  20' 19"  Marco Pinotti  + 2"  Alexander Vinokourov  + 17"
Final general classification: (1) Ivan Basso   87h 44' 01" (2) David Arroyo  + 1' 51" (3) Vincenzo Nibali  + 2' 37"
Basso wins his second Giro d'Italia, having previously won in 2006.

Equestrianism
Show jumping:
FEI Nations Cup Promotional League:
FEI Nations Cup of Portugal in Lisbon (CSIO 4*):   (Henk van de Pol on Abeltje Z, Aniek Poels on Asteria, Marlies van Soest on Rodos, Peter Bulthuis on Cashmir)   (Charlotte Platt on Ulien, William Funnell on Billy Congo, Robert Bevis on Courtney, Tim Stockdale on Kalico Bay)   (Andrea Herholdt on Viko, Daniele Augusto da Rios on Ultimate, Francesca Capponi on Stallone, Luca Moneta on Jesus de la Commune)
Standings (after 5 of 11 competitions): (1)  34 points (2)  33 (3)  25
Grand Prix Loro Piana, Rome (CSIO 5*):  McLain Ward  on Sapphire  John Whitaker  on Peppermill  Rodrigo Pessoa  on Rebozo

Football (soccer)
AFC Women's Asian Cup in Chengdu, China:
Third place playoff:   2–0 
Final:   1–1 (5–4 pen.)  
Australia win the Cup for the first time.
European Under-17 Championship in Liechtenstein:
Final:  2–1 
England win the Championship for the first time.
UEFA Women's Under-19 Championship in Macedonia: (teams in bold advance to semi-finals)
Group A:
 3–3 
 1–2 
Final standings: Germany 9 points, England 6, Italy, Scotland 1.
Group B:
 6–1 
 0–2 
Final standings: Netherlands 9 points, France 6, Spain 3, Macedonia 0.
2011 UEFA European Under-21 Championship qualification:
Group 2:  0–0 
Standings: Switzerland 17 points (9 matches),  13 (8),  12 (9),  10 (8), Georgia 9 (7),  4 (7)
 Luxembourg Cup Final in Luxembourg city:
Grevenmacher 0–1 Differdange 03 
FC Differdange 03 win the Cup for the first time.
 Moldovan Cup Final in Chişinău:
Dacia 0–2 Sheriff
Sheriff win the Cup for the seventh time.

Futsal
AFC Championship in Tashkent, Uzbekistan:
Third place play-off:  1–6  
Final:   3–8  
Iran win the Championship for the 10th time.

Golf
Senior majors:
Senior PGA Championship in Parker, Colorado, United States:
 (1) Tom Lehman  281 (−7)PO (T2) Fred Couples , David Frost  281
Lehman pars the first playoff hole to collect his first senior major win and second Champions Tour title.
PGA Tour:
Crowne Plaza Invitational at Colonial in Fort Worth, Texas:
Winner: Zach Johnson  259 (−21)
Johnson picks up his seventh PGA Tour win and sets a new course record.
European Tour:
Madrid Masters in Spain:
Winner: Luke Donald  267 (−21)
Donald wins his first European Tour title since 2004 and the third of his career.
LPGA Tour:
HSBC LPGA Brasil Cup in Brazil:
Winner: Meaghan Francella  140 (−6)
In this unofficial event, Francella wins her third professional title.

Handball
EHF Champions League Final Four in Cologne, Germany:
3/4 Match: Chekhovskiye Medvedi  28–36   BM Ciudad Real
Final:  FC Barcelona  34–36   THW Kiel
Kiel win the Champions League for the second time.

Rugby union
IRB Junior World Trophy in Moscow, Russia:
7th place play-off:  22–46 
5th place play-off:  13–11 
3rd place play-off:  20–23 (aet)  
Final:   36–7  
Italy win the Trophy for the first time.
IRB Sevens World Series:
Scotland Sevens in Edinburgh:
Shield:  7–26 
Bowl:  26–10 
Plate:  19–0 
Cup:  41–14 
Final series standings: (1) Samoa 164 points (2)  149 (3) Australia 122
Samoa win the series for the first time.
The first 2010 IRB Award is handed out, with Samoa's Mikaele Pesamino named as International Sevens Player of the Year.
 Mid-year Tests:
  35–26 Barbarians in London

Table tennis
World Team Championships in Moscow, Russia:
Men's final:  3–1 
China win the title for the fifth successive time and 18th overall.
Women's final:  1–3 
Singapore win the title for the first time and stop China's winning streak at eight.

Tennis
Grand Slams:
French Open in Paris, France:
Men's singles, fourth round:
Roger Federer  [1] def. Stanislas Wawrinka  [20] 6–3, 7–6(5), 6–2
Tomáš Berdych  [15] def. Andy Murray  [4] 6–4, 7–5, 6–3
Robin Söderling  [5] def. Marin Čilić  [10] 6–4, 6–4, 6–2
Mikhail Youzhny  [11] def. Jo-Wilfried Tsonga  [8] 6–2 retired
Women's singles, fourth round:
Nadia Petrova  [19] def. Venus Williams  [2] 6–4, 6–3
Caroline Wozniacki  [3] def. Flavia Pennetta  [14] 7–6(5), 6–7(4), 6–2
Elena Dementieva  [5] def. Chanelle Scheepers  6–1, 6–3
Francesca Schiavone  [17] def. Maria Kirilenko  [30] 6–4, 6–4

May 29, 2010 (Saturday)

Auto racing
Nationwide Series:
TECH-NET Auto Service 300 powered by Carquest in Concord, North Carolina: (1)  Kyle Busch (Toyota; Joe Gibbs Racing) (2)  Brad Keselowski (Dodge; Penske Racing) (3)  Joey Logano (Toyota; Joe Gibbs Racing)
Drivers' championship standings (after 12 of 35 races): (1) Keselowski 1946 points (2) Busch 1945 (3)  Kevin Harvick (Chevrolet; Kevin Harvick Incorporated) 1852

Baseball
Major League Baseball:
Roy Halladay becomes the 20th pitcher in Major League Baseball history to throw a perfect game in the Philadelphia Phillies' 1–0 win over the Florida Marlins. This is the first time in the modern era that two perfect games have been thrown in the same season.

Basketball
FIBA Asia Champions Cup in Doha, Qatar:
Semi-finals:
Al-Rayyan  82–62  ASU
Al-Riyadi Beirut  64–71  Mahram Tehran
 NBA Playoffs (best-of-7 series):
Western Conference Finals:
Game 6: Los Angeles Lakers 111, Phoenix Suns 103. Lakers win series 4–2.
 Dominet Bank Ekstraliga Final (best-of-7 series):
Game 4: Anwil Włocławek 79–80 Asseco Prokom Gdynia. Asseco Prokom Gdynia win series 4–0.
Asseco Prokom win the championship for the seventh straight time.
 National Basketball League Final (best-of-7 series):
Game 2: Nymburk 81–65 Prostějov. Nymburk lead series 2–0.
 Premier A Slovenian Basketball League Final (best-of-5 series):
Game 1: Union Olimpija 68–62 Krka. Union Olimpija lead series 1–0.

Cricket
Bangladesh in England:
1st Test in London, day 3:
 505 (125 overs);  237/7 (81.5 overs). Bangladesh trail by 268 runs with 3 wickets remaining in the 1st innings.

Cycling
Grand Tours:
Giro d'Italia:
Stage 20:  Johann Tschopp  5h 26' 47"  Cadel Evans   + 16"  Ivan Basso   + 25"
General classification: (1) Basso  87h 23' 00" (2) David Arroyo  + 1' 15" (3) Vincenzo Nibali  + 2' 56"

Football (soccer)
2011 UEFA European Under-21 Championship qualification: (teams in strike are eliminated)
Group 8:  0–3 
Standings: Ukraine 14 points (6 matches),  11 (5),  11 (6),  6 (6), Malta 0 (7)

Golf
Senior majors:
Senior PGA Championship in Parker, Colorado, United States:
 Leaderboard after third round (all USA): (1) Jay Don Blake & Tom Lehman 210 (–6) (T3) Fred Couples, Mike Goodes & Mark O'Meara 212

Handball
EHF Champions League Final Four in Cologne, Germany:
Semifinals:
Chekhovskiye Medvedi  27–34  FC Barcelona
BM Ciudad Real  27–29  THW Kiel

Ice hockey
Stanley Cup Finals (best-of-7 series):
Game 1: Chicago Blackhawks 6, Philadelphia Flyers 5. Blackhawks lead series 1–0.

Mixed martial arts
UFC 114 in Las Vegas:
Welterweight bout: Diego Sanchez  def. John Hathaway  via unanimous decision (30–27, 30–27, 30–26).
Light Heavyweight bout: Antônio Rogério Nogueira  def. Jason Brilz  via split decision (28–29, 29–28, 29–28).
Heavyweight bout: Mike Russow  def. Todd Duffee  via KO (punch) at 2:35 in round 3.
Middleweight bout: Dan Miller  def. Michael Bisping  via unanimous decision (30–27, 30–27, 29–27).
Light Heavyweight bout: Rashad Evans  def. Quinton Jackson  via unanimous decision (29–28, 30–27, 30–27).

Rugby union
Celtic League playoffs:
Grand Final in Dublin:
Leinster  12–17  Ospreys
Ospreys win the championship for the third time.
Super 14 finals series:
Final in Soweto:
Bulls  25–17  Stormers
Bulls win the Super 14 for the second consecutive time and third time overall.
 Guinness Premiership playoffs:
Final in London:
Leicester Tigers 33–27 Saracens
Leicester win the Premiership for the ninth time.
 Top 14 playoffs:
Final in Saint-Denis:
Perpignan 6–19 Clermont Auvergne
Clermont Auvergne win the championship for the first time, having previously lost in ten French championship finals.

Table tennis
World Team Championships in Moscow, Russia:
Men's semifinals:
 3–0 
 3–1 
Women's semifinals:
 3–0 
 0–3

Tennis
Grand Slams:
French Open in Paris, France:
Men's singles, third round:
Rafael Nadal  [2] def. Lleyton Hewitt  [28] 6–3, 6–4, 6–3
Novak Djokovic  [3] def. Victor Hănescu  [31] 6–3, 3–6, 6–3, 6–2
Teymuraz Gabashvili  [Q] def. Andy Roddick  [6] 6–4, 6–4, 6–2
Fernando Verdasco  [7] vs Philipp Kohlschreiber  [30] 2–6, 6–3, 6–3, 6–7(1), 6–4
Jürgen Melzer  [22] def. David Ferrer  [9] 6–4, 6–0, 7–6(1)
Women's singles, third round:
Serena Williams  [1] def. Anastasia Pavlyuchenkova  [29] 6–1, 1–6, 6–2
Jelena Janković  [4] def. Alona Bondarenko  [27] 6–4, 7–6(3)
Samantha Stosur  [7] def. Anastasia Pivovarova  6–3, 6–2

Volleyball
Men's Pan-American Cup in San Juan, Puerto Rico:
Classification 5–6:  3–0 
Classification 3–4:  1–3  
Final:   3–0  
United States win the cup for the third consecutive time and fourth time overall. American Jayson Jablonsky was elected MVP.

May 28, 2010 (Friday)

Basketball
FIBA Asia Champions Cup in Doha, Qatar:
Quarter-finals:
ASU  74–59  Astana Tigers
Mahram  88–60  Al-Jalaa
Al-Rayyan  97–59  Al-Hilal
Al-Riyadi  74–63  Smart Gilas
 NBA Playoffs (best-of-7 series):
Eastern Conference Finals:
Game 6: Boston Celtics 96, Orlando Magic 84. Celtics win series 4–2.
 Ukrainian SuperLeague Final (best-of-5 series):
Game 4: Azovmash Mariupol 74–77 Budivelnyk Kyiv. Series tied 2–2.
 National Basketball League Final (best-of-7 series):
Game 1: Nymburk 85–70 Prostějov. Nymburk lead series 1–0.
 Novo Basquete Brasil Finals (best-of-5 series):
Game 2: Universo/BRB 93–90 Flamengo. Series tied 1–1.

Cricket
Bangladesh in England:
1st Test in London, day 2:
 505 (125 overs; Jonathan Trott 226);  172/2 (53 overs). Bangladesh trail by 333 runs with 8 wickets remaining in the 1st innings.
South Africa in West Indies:
3rd ODI in Roseau, Dominica:
 224 (47.2 overs);  157 (38 overs). South Africa win by 67 runs; lead 5-match series 3–0.
Tri-nation series in Zimbabwe:
Group stage:
 285/5 (50 overs; Rohit Sharma 114);  289/4 (48.2 overs) in Bulawayo. Zimbabwe win by 6 wickets.

Cycling
Grand Tours:
Giro d'Italia:
Stage 19:  Michele Scarponi  5h 27' 04"  Ivan Basso  s.t.  Vincenzo Nibali  s.t.
General classification: (1) Basso  81h 55' 56" (2) David Arroyo  + 51" (3) Nibali + 2' 30"

Equestrianism
Show jumping
Meydan FEI Nations Cup:
FEI Nations Cup of Italy in Rome (CSIO 5*):   (Penelope Leprevost on Mylord Carthago, Kevin Staut on Silvana, Nicolas Delmotte on Luccianno, Patrice Delaveau on Katchina Mail)   (Nick Skelton on Carlo, Peter Charles on Murka's Pom d'Ami, Ben Maher on Robin Hood W, John Whitaker on Peppermill)   (Cameron Hanley on Southwind VDL, Darragh Kenny on Obelix, Cian O'Connor on K Club Lady, Billy Twomey on Tinka's Serenade)   (Pilar Lucrecia Cordon Muro on Herald 3, Julio Arias Cueva on Jarnac, Jesus Germendia Echevarria on Lord Du Mont Milon, Ricardo Jurado Narvaez on Julia des Brumes)
Standings (after 2 of 8 competitions): (1)  20 points (2)  12.5 (3)  10

Futsal
AFC Championship in Tashkent, Uzbekistan:
Semi-finals:
 4–3 
 7–0

Golf
Senior majors:
Senior PGA Championship in Parker, Colorado, United States:
 Leaderboard after second round (all USA): (1) Fred Couples 137 (–7) (2) Tom Kite 138 (3) Tom Lehman 139

Tennis
Grand Slams:
French Open in Paris, France:
Men's singles, second round:
Rafael Nadal  [2] def. Horacio Zeballos  6–2, 6–2, 6–3
Novak Djokovic  [3] def. Kei Nishikori  6–1, 6–4, 6–4
Fernando Verdasco  [7] def. Florent Serra  6–2, 6–2, 0–6, 6–4
David Ferrer  [9] def. Xavier Malisse  6–2, 6–2, 2–0 retired
Men's singles, third round:
Roger Federer  [1] def. Julian Reister  6–4, 6–0, 6–4
Andy Murray  [4] def. Marcos Baghdatis  [25] 6–2, 6–3, 0–6, 6–2
Robin Söderling  [5] def. Albert Montañés  [29] 6–4, 7–5, 2–6, 6–3
Jo-Wilfried Tsonga  [8] def. Thiemo de Bakker  7–6(6), 6–7(4), 6–3, 6–4
Marin Čilić  [10] def. Leonardo Mayer  6–4, 3–6, 7–5, 6–7(5), 6–4
Women's singles, second round:
Serena Williams  [1] def. Julia Görges  6–1, 6–1
Samantha Stosur  [7] def. Rossana de los Ríos  4–6, 6–1, 6–0
Women's singles, third round:
Venus Williams  [2] def. Dominika Cibulková  [26] 6–3, 6–4
Caroline Wozniacki  [3] def. Alexandra Dulgheru  [31] 6–3, 6–4
Elena Dementieva  [5] def. Aleksandra Wozniak  6–7(2), 6–3, 6–4
Maria Kirilenko  [30] def. Svetlana Kuznetsova  [6] 6–3, 2–6, 6–4

Volleyball
Men's Pan-American Cup in San Juan, Puerto Rico:
Classification 7–8:  1–3 
Semifinals:
 3–0 
 2–3

May 27, 2010 (Thursday)

Basketball
 NBA Playoffs (best-of-7 series):
Western Conference Finals:
Game 5: Los Angeles Lakers 103, Phoenix Suns 101. Lakers lead series 3–2.
 Turkish Basketball League Playoffs Finals (best-of-7 series):
Game 4: Fenerbahçe Ülker 85–79 Efes Pilsen. Fenerbahçe Ülker lead series 3–1.
 National Basketball League Finals (best-of-5 series):
Game 4: Levski Sofia 71–89 Lukoil Academic. Lukoil Academic win series 3–1.
Lukoil Academic win the championship for the eighth straight time and 20th overall.
 Dominet Bank Ekstraliga Final: (best-of-7 series):
Game 3: Anwil Włocławek 76–79 Asseco Prokom Gdynia. Asseco Prokom Gdynia lead series 3–0.
 Österreichische Basketball Bundesliga Final (best-of-5 series):
Game 4: Gmunden 82–79 Fürstenfeld. Series tied 2–2.
 Israeli Basketball Super League Final Four in Tel Aviv:
Third-place playoff:  Hapoel Jerusalem 95–82 Elitzur Maccabi Netanya
Final:  Gilboa/Galil 90–77  Maccabi Tel Aviv
Gilboa/Galil win the championship for the second time, having done so in 1993 as Hapoel Galil Elyon.
Maccabi Tel Aviv fail to win the title for the second time in three years, after winning all-but-one of the previous 38 years.

Cricket
Bangladesh in England:
1st Test in London, day 1:
 362/4 (90 overs; Jonathan Trott 175*);

Cycling
Grand Tours:
Giro d'Italia:
Stage 18:  André Greipel  3h 14' 59"  Julian Dean  s.t.  Tiziano Dall'Antonia  s.t.
General classification: (1) David Arroyo   76h 26' 37" (2) Ivan Basso  + 2' 27" (3) Richie Porte   + 2' 44"

Football (soccer)
AFC Women's Asian Cup in Chengdu, China:
Semi finals:
 0–1 
 0–1 (a.e.t.) 
European Under-17 Championship in Liechtenstein:
Semifinals:
 2–1 
 3–1 
UEFA Women's Under-19 Championship in Macedonia: (teams in bold advance to semi-finals, teams in strike are eliminated)
Group A:
 1–5 
 2–1 
Standings (after 2 matches): Germany, England 6 points, Italy, Scotland 0.
Group B:
 0–6 
 2–0 
Standings (after 2 matches): Netherlands 6 points, Spain, France 3, Macedonia 0.
Toulon Tournament in Toulon, France
Third place play-off:  1–2  
Final:   3–2  
Côte d'Ivoire become the first team from Africa to win the tournament.

Futsal
AFC Championship in Tashkent, Uzbekistan:
Quarter-finals:
 2–9 
 4–0 
 5–3 
 7–1

Golf
Senior majors:
Senior PGA Championship in Parker, Colorado, United States:
 Leaderboard after first round (USA unless indicated): (T1) Robin Freeman & Bernhard Langer  66 (–6) (T3) Brad Bryant & Tom Lehman 68

Tennis
Grand Slams:
French Open in Paris, France:
Men's singles, second round:
Andy Murray  [4] def. Juan Ignacio Chela  6–2, 6–7(5), 6–3, 6–2
Andy Roddick  [6] def. Blaž Kavčič  6–3, 5–7, 6–4, 6–2
Women's singles, second round:
Jelena Janković  [4] def. Kaia Kanepi  6–2, 3–6, 6–4
Elena Dementieva  [5] def. Anabel Medina Garrigues  6–2, 7–6(3)
Yaroslava Shvedova  def. Agnieszka Radwańska  [8] 7–5, 6–3

Volleyball
Men's Pan-American Cup in San Juan, Puerto Rico:
Classification 9:  2–3 
Quarterfinals:
 3–0 
 2–3

May 26, 2010 (Wednesday)

Basketball
FIBA Asia Champions Cup in Doha, Qatar: (teams in bold advance to the quarter-finals)
Group A:
Mahram  72–78  Al-Rayyan
Duhok  74–76  Smart Gilas
Final standings: Al-Rayyan 8 points, Mahram 7,  Astana Tigers 6, Smart Gilas 5, Duhok 4.
Group B:
Al-Hilal  63–96  ASU
Al-Riyadi  92–83  Al-Nasr
Final standings: Al-Riyadi 8 points, ASU 7,  Al-Jalaa 6, Al-Hilal 5, Al-Nasr 4.
 NBA Playoffs (best-of-7 series):
Eastern Conference Finals:
Game 5: Orlando Magic 113, Boston Celtics 92. Celtics lead series 3–2.
 A1 Ethniki Final (best-of-5 series):
Game 1: Panathinaikos 73–54 Olympiacos. Panathinaikos lead series 1–0.
 Ukrainian SuperLeague Final (best-of-5 series):
Game 3: Azovmash Mariupol 77–60 Budivelnyk Kyiv. Azovmash Mariupol lead series 2–1.

Cycling
Grand Tours:
Giro d'Italia:
Stage 17:  Damien Monier  4h 29' 19"  Danilo Hondo  + 36"  Steven Kruijswijk  + 39"
General classification: (1) David Arroyo   73h 11' 38" (2) Ivan Basso  + 2' 27" (3) Richie Porte   + 2' 44"

Football (soccer)
2011 UEFA European Under-21 Championship qualification:
Group 2:  0–2 
Standings: Switzerland 16 points (8 matches), Turkey 13 (8),  12 (9),  10 (8),  8 (6),  4 (7)
 Georgian Cup Final in Tbilisi:
WIT Georgia 1–0 Dinamo Tbilisi
WIT Georgia win the Cup for the first time.
 Magyar Kupa Final in Budapest:
Debrecen 3–2 Zalaegerszegi TE
Debrecen win the Cup for the fourth time.
 Macedonian Cup Final in Skopje:
Rabotnički 2–3 Teteks
Teteks win the Cup for the first time.
 Cupa României Final in Iaşi:
CFR Cluj 0–0 (5–4 pen.) FC Vaslui
CFR Cluj win the Cup for the third straight time.

Rugby union
IRB Junior World Trophy in Moscow, Russia: (teams in bold advance to the final)
Pool A:
 48–12 
 16–12 
Final standings: Italy 14 points, Romania 9, Uruguay 7, Papua New Guinea 0.
Pool B:
 19–21 
 17–38 
Final standings: Japan 11 points, Russia 8, Canada 5, Zimbabwe 3.
 RFU Championship Final, second leg:
Bristol 10–29 (6–9) Exeter
Exeter win 38–16 on aggregate to claim the inaugural RFU Championship title and earn promotion to the Guinness Premiership for the first time in their history.

Tennis
Grand Slams:
French Open in Paris, France:
Men's singles, second round:
Roger Federer  [1] def. Alejandro Falla  7–6(4), 6–2, 6–4
Andy Murray  [4] vs. Juan Ignacio Chela  6–2, 3–3 (match suspended)
Robin Söderling  [5] def. Taylor Dent  6–0, 6–1, 6–1
Jo-Wilfried Tsonga  [8] def. Josselin Ouanna  6–0, 6–1, 6–4
Marin Čilić  [10] def. Daniel Gimeno-Traver  6–3, 7–6(4), 6–2
Women's singles, second round:
Venus Williams  [2] def. Arantxa Parra Santonja  6–2, 6–4
Caroline Wozniacki  [3] def. Tathiana Garbin  6–3, 6–1
Svetlana Kuznetsova  [6] def. Andrea Petković  4–6, 7–5, 6–4

Volleyball
Men's Pan-American Cup in San Juan, Puerto Rico: (teams in bold advance to the semifinals; teams in italic advance to quarterfinals playoffs)
Group A:  0–3 
Final standings:  4 points, Canada 3, Colombia 2.
Group B:  3–1 
Final standings: United States 4 points, Puerto Rico 3,  2.
Group C:  0–3 
Final standings:  4 points, Dominican Republic 3, Venezuela 2.

May 25, 2010 (Tuesday)

American football
 The National Football League announces that Super Bowl XLVIII, to be held in February 2014 following the 2013 season, will be held at Meadowlands Stadium in East Rutherford, New Jersey, the soon-to-open home of the New York Giants and New York Jets. This will be the first Super Bowl to be held in an open-air stadium in a cold-weather location.

Basketball
FIBA Asia Champions Cup in Doha, Qatar: (teams in bold advance to the quarterfinals; teams in strike are eliminated)
Group A:
Al-Rayyan  86–65  Astana Tigers
Mahram  86–72  Smart Gilas
Standings: Mahram, Al-Rayyan 6 points (3 games), Astana Tigers 6 (4), Smart Gilas,  Duhok 3 (3).
Group B:
Al-Jalaa  95–85  Al-Nasr
ASU  72–73  Al-Riyadi
Standings: Al-Riyadi 6 points (3 games), Al-Jalaa 6 (4), ASU 5 (3),  Al-Hilal 4 (3), Al-Nasr 3 (3).
 NBA Playoffs (best-of-7 series):
Western Conference Finals:
Game 4: Phoenix Suns 115, Los Angeles Lakers 106. Series tied 2–2.
 Turkish Basketball League Playoffs Finals (best-of-7 series):
Game 3: Fenerbahçe Ülker 72–70 Efes Pilsen. Fenerbahçe Ülker lead series 2–1.
 National Basketball League Finals (best-of-5 series):
Game 3: Levski Sofia 86–74 Lukoil Academic. Lukoil Academic lead series 2–1.
 Israeli Basketball Super League Final Four in Tel Aviv:
Semifinals:
Hapoel Jerusalem 69–79 Gilboa/Galil
Maccabi Tel Aviv 104–78 Elitzur Maccabi Netanya

Cycling
Grand Tours:
Giro d'Italia:
Stage 16:  Stefano Garzelli  41' 28"  Cadel Evans   + 42"  John Gadret  + 54"
General classification: (1) David Arroyo   68h 32' 26" (2) Ivan Basso  + 2' 27" (3) Richie Porte   + 2' 36"

Futsal
AFC Championship in Tashkent, Uzbekistan: (teams in bold advance to quarter-finals)
Group A:
 4–1 
 2–4 
Final standings: Uzbekistan 9 points, Lebanon 6, Indonesia 3, Chinese Taipei 0.
Group B:
 5–4 
 7–0 
Final standings: Iran 9 points, Australia 6, Tajikistan 3, Kuwait 0.
Group C:
 5–2 
 4–4 
Final standings: Thailand 9 points, Kyrgyzstan 4, Vietnam 3, South Korea 1.
Group D:
 1–0 
 6–7 
Final standings: Japan 9 points, China 6, Iraq 3, Turkmenistan 0.

Tennis
Grand Slams:
French Open in Paris, France:
Men's singles, first round:
Rafael Nadal  [2] def. Gianni Mina  6–2, 6–2, 6–2
Andy Roddick  [6] def. Jarkko Nieminen  6–2, 4–6, 4–6, 7–6(4), 6–3
Fernando Verdasco  [7] def. Igor Kunitsyn  6–4, 6–2, 6–2
David Ferrer  [9] def. David Guez  6–1, 6–3, 6–1
Women's singles, first round:
Kimiko Date-Krumm  def. Dinara Safina  [9] 3–6, 6–4, 7–5

Volleyball
Men's Pan-American Cup in San Juan, Puerto Rico:
Group A:  2–3 
Standings: Brazil 4 points (2 matches), Canada,  1 (1).
Group B:  2–3 
Standings: , United States 2 points (1 match), Mexico 2 (2).
Group C:  3–0 
Standings: Argentina 4 points (2 matches), Venezuela 1 (1).

May 24, 2010 (Monday)

Basketball
FIBA Asia Champions Cup in Doha, Qatar: (teams in bold advance to the quarterfinals)
Group A:
Mahram  109–68  Duhok
Astana Tigers  77–71 (OT)  Smart Gilas
Standings: Astana Tigers 5 points (3 games), Mahram,  Al-Rayyan 4 (2), Duhok 3 (3), Smart Gilas 2 (2)
Group B:
Al-Riyadi  83–77  Al-Hilal
Al-Jalaa  64–78  ASU
Standings: ASU, Al-Riyadi 4 points (2 games), Al-Jalaa, Al-Hilal 4 (3),  Al-Nasr 2 (2).
 NBA Playoffs (best-of-7 series):
Eastern Conference Finals:
Game 4: Orlando Magic 96, Boston Celtics 92. Celtics lead series 3–1.
Mike Brown is fired as head coach of the Cleveland Cavaliers, having lost 4–2 to the Boston Celtics in the Conference Semi-Finals. (AP via NBA)
 Dominet Bank Ekstraliga Final: (best-of-7 series):
Game 2: Asseco Prokom Gdynia 91–84 Anwil Włocławek. Asseco Prokom Gdynia lead series 2–0.
 Österreichische Basketball Bundesliga Final (best-of-5 series):
Game 3: Gmunden 65–68 Fürstenfeld. Fürstenfeld lead series 2–1.

Cricket
South Africa in West Indies:
2nd ODI in Port of Spain, Trinidad:
 300/5 (50 overs);  283 (48.1 overs). South Africa win by 17 runs; lead 5-match series 2–0.

Darts
Premier League Play-offs in London, England:
Semi-finals: (best of 15 legs)
Simon Whitlock  6–8 James Wade 
Phil Taylor  8–1 Mervyn King 
Third place play-off: (best of 15 legs)
Simon Whitlock  7–8 Mervyn King 
Final: (best of 19 legs)
James Wade  8–10 Phil Taylor 
Taylor wins his fifth Premier League title.
Taylor achieves two nine dart finishes during the match, and also records the highest checkout of the night with 147, when checking out his first nine dart finish.

Football (soccer)
Women's Asian Cup in Chengdu, China:
Group A: (teams in bold advance to semi-finals)
 1–2 
 0–2 
Final standings: Japan 9 points, Korea DPR 6, Thailand 3, Myanmar 0.
European Under-17 Championship in Liechtenstein: (teams in bold advance to semi-finals)
Group A:
 1–3 
 2–0 
Final standings: Spain 9 points, France 6, Portugal 3, Switzerland 0.
Group B:
 0–0 
 1–2 
Final standings: England 9 points, Turkey 4, Czech Republic 2, Greece 1.
UEFA Women's Under-19 Championship in Macedonia:
Group A:
 1–3 
 4–1 
Group B:
 0–6 
 2–0

Futsal
AFC Championship in Tashkent, Uzbekistan: (teams in bold advance to quarter-finals, teams in strike are eliminated)
Group A:
 6–4 
 2–4 
Standings (after 2 matches): Uzbekistan 6 points, Indonesia, Lebanon 3, Chinese Taipei 0.
Group B:
 4–3 
 3–9 
Standings (after 2 matches): Iran 6 points, Australia, Tajikistan 3, Kuwait 0.
Group C:
 4–2 
 3–10 
Standings (after 2 matches): Thailand 6 points, Vietnam, Kyrgyzstan 3, Korea Republic 0.
Group D:
 6–2 
 1–10 
Standings (after 2 matches): Japan 6 points, China, Iraq 3, Turkmenistan 0.

Ice hockey
Stanley Cup playoffs (best-of-7 series):
Eastern Conference Finals:
Game 5: Philadelphia Flyers 4, Montreal Canadiens 2. Flyers win series 4–1.

Tennis
Grand Slams:
French Open in Paris, France:
Men's singles, first round:
Roger Federer  [1] def. Peter Luczak  6–4, 6–1, 6–2
Novak Djokovic  [3] def. Evgeny Korolev  6–1, 3–6, 6–1, 6–3
Andy Murray  [4] def. Richard Gasquet  4–6, 6–7(5), 6–4, 6–2, 6–1
Women's singles, first round:
Serena Williams  [1] def. Stefanie Vögele  7–6(2), 6–2
Caroline Wozniacki  [3] def. Alla Kudryavtseva  6–0, 6–3
Jelena Janković  [4] def. Alicia Molik  6–0, 6–4
Elena Dementieva  [5] def. Petra Martić  6–1, 6–1
Samantha Stosur  [7] def. Simona Halep  7–5, 6–1
Agnieszka Radwańska  [8] def. Elena Baltacha  6–0, 7–5

Volleyball
Men's Pan-American Cup in San Juan, Puerto Rico:
Group A:  3–1 
Group B:  3–1 
Group C:  0–3

May 23, 2010 (Sunday)

Athletics
IAAF Diamond League:
Shanghai Golden Grand Prix in Shanghai, China
Men:
200m: Usain Bolt  19.76
400m: Jeremy Wariner  45.41
1500m: Augustine Kiprono Choge  3:32.20
110m Hurdles: David Oliver  12.99
Long Jump: Ingisious Gaisah  7.83 m
High Jump: Sylwester Bednarek  2.24 m
Pole vault: Hendrik Gruber  5.40 m
Discus throw: Zoltán Kővágó  69.69 m
Javelin throw: Andreas Thorkildsen  83.47 m
Women:
100m: Carmelita Jeter  11.09
800m: Janeth Jepkosgei Busienei  2:01.06
5000m: Sentayehu Ejigu  14:30.96
400m Hurdles: Lashinda Demus  53.34
3000m Steeplechase: Gladys Jerotich Kipkemoi  9:16.82
Triple Jump: Olga Rypakova  14.89 m
Shot Put: Nadzeya Astapchuk  20.70 m

Auto racing
World Touring Car Championship:
Race of Italy:
Round 5: (1) Andy Priaulx  (BMW Team RBM; BMW 320si) (2) Augusto Farfus  (BMW Team RBM; BMW 320si) (3) Rob Huff  (Chevrolet; Chevrolet Cruze)
Round 6: (1) Yvan Muller  (Chevrolet; Chevrolet Cruze) (2) Tom Coronel  (SR-Sport; SEAT León) (3) Huff
Drivers' championship standings (after 6 of 22 rounds): (1) Muller 100 points (2) Gabriele Tarquini  (SR-Sport; SEAT León) 76 (3) Huff 76
Manufacturers' championship standings: (1) Chevrolet 193 points (2) SEAT Customers Technology 177 (3) BMW 158

Basketball
FIBA Asia Champions Cup in Doha, Qatar:
Group A:
Duhok  68–75  Astana Tigers
Smart Gilas  58–86  Al-Rayyan
Standings: Al-Rayyan 4 points (2 games), Astana Tigers 3 (2),  Mahram 2 (1), Duhok 2 (2), Smart Gilas 1 (1).
Group B:
ASU  90–74  Al-Nasr
Al-Hilal  63–93  Al-Jalaa
Standings: Al-Jalaa, Al-Hilal 3 points (2 games), ASU,  Al-Riyadi Beirut 2 (1), Al-Nasr 2 (2).
 NBA Playoffs (best-of-7 series):
Western Conference Finals:
Game 3: Phoenix Suns 118, Los Angeles Lakers 109. Lakers lead series 2–1.
 Ukrainian SuperLeague Final (best-of-5 series):
Game 2: Budivelnyk Kyiv 95–91 Azovmash Mariupol. Series tied 1–1.

Cricket
New Zealand against Sri Lanka in USA:
2nd T20I in Lauderhill, Florida:
 81 (17.3 overs);  86/3 (15.3 overs). Sri Lanka win by 7 wickets, 2-match series drawn 1–1.

Cycling
Grand Tours:
Giro d'Italia:
Stage 15:  Ivan Basso  6h 21' 58"  Cadel Evans  + 1' 19"  Michele Scarponi  + 1' 30"
General classification: (1) David Arroyo   67h 48' 42" (2) Richie Porte   + 2' 35" (3) Basso + 3' 33"
Tour of California:
Stage 8:  Ryder Hesjedal  3h 21' 56"  George Hincapie  s.t.  Carlos Barredo  s.t.
Final general classification: (1) Michael Rogers   33h 08' 30" (2) David Zabriskie  + 9" (3) Levi Leipheimer  + 25"

Darts
Premier League Play-offs in London, England: Postponed to May 24 due to a power cut.

Football (soccer)
Women's Asian Cup in Chengdu, China:
Group B: (teams in bold advance to the semi-finals)
 1–0 
 0–5 
Final standings: China PR 7 points, Australia 6, Korea Republic 4, Vietnam 0.
2011 UEFA European Under-21 Championship qualification:
Group 2:  1–0 
Standings:  16 points (7 matches), Estonia 12 (9), Turkey 10 (7),  10 (8),  8 (6),  4 (7).
 Hungarian First Division, final matchday: (team in bold qualify for the Champions League, teams in italics qualify for Europa League)
(10) Kecskemét 1–0 (1) Debrecen
(3) Győr 1–0 (2) Videoton
Final standings: Debrecen 62 points, Videoton 61, Győr 57.
Debrecen win the Championship for the second consecutive time and fifth time overall.
 Primera División de México Bicentenario Liguilla Final, second leg: (first leg score in parentheses)
Toluca 0–0 (2–2) Santos Laguna. 2–2 on aggregate, Toluca win 4–3 on penalties.
Toluca win the championship for the tenth time.
 Azerbaijan Cup Final in Baku:
Khazar Lankaran 1–2 (a.e.t.) Baku
Baku win the Cup for the second time.
 Belarusian Cup Final in Minsk:
BATE Borisov 5–0 Torpedo Zhodino
BATE win the Cup for the second time.
 Maltese Cup Final in Ta' Qali:
Valletta 2–1 Qormi
Valletta win the Cup for the 12th time.

Futsal
AFC Championship in Tashkent, Uzbekistan:
Group A:
 3–1 
 1–6 
Group B:
 19–2 
 2–4 
Group C:
 4–2 
 7–3 
Group D:
 5–1 
 3–5

Golf
PGA Tour:
HP Byron Nelson Championship in Irving, Texas:
Winner: Jason Day  270 (−10)
Day wins his first PGA Tour title.
European Tour:
BMW PGA Championship in Virginia Water, England:
Winner: Simon Khan  278 (−6)
Khan wins his second European Tour title.
LPGA Tour:
Sybase Match Play Championship in Gladstone, New Jersey:
Consolation Match: Jiyai Shin  def. Amy Yang  3 & 2
Final: Sun Young Yoo  def. Angela Stanford  3 & 1
Yoo wins her first LPGA Tour title.

Ice hockey
Men's World Championship in Germany:
Bronze medal game:  1–3  
Gold medal game:   1–2  
Czech Republic win the Championship for the 12th time.
Stanley Cup playoffs (best-of-7 series):
Western Conference Finals:
Game 4: Chicago Blackhawks 4, San Jose Sharks 2. Blackhawks win series 4–0.
Memorial Cup in Brandon, Manitoba:
Final: Windsor Spitfires 9, Brandon Wheat Kings 1.
Windsor Spitfires win their second consecutive Memorial Cup.

Motorcycle racing
Moto GP:
French motorcycle Grand Prix in Le Mans, France:
MotoGP: (1) Jorge Lorenzo  (Yamaha) (2) Valentino Rossi  (Yamaha) (3) Andrea Dovizioso  (Honda)
Riders' championship standings (after 3 of 18 rounds): (1) Lorenzo 70 points (2) Rossi 61 (3) Dovizioso 42
Manufacturers' championship standings: (1) Yamaha 75 points (2) Honda 52 (3) Ducati 39
Moto2: (1) Toni Elías  (Moriwaki) (2) Julián Simón  (Suter) (3) Simone Corsi  (MotoBi)
Riders' championship standings (after 3 of 17 rounds): (1) Elías 63 points (2) Shoya Tomizawa  (Suter) 45 (3) Corsi 35
Manufacturers' championship standings: (1) Suter 65 points (2) Moriwaki 63 (3) MotoBi 37
125cc: (1) Pol Espargaró  (Derbi) (2) Nicolás Terol  (Aprilia) (3) Marc Márquez  (Derbi)
Riders' championship standings (after 3 of 17 rounds): (1) Terol 65 points (2) Espargaró 63 (3) Esteve Rabat  (Aprilia) 34
Manufacturers' championship standings: (1) Derbi 70 points (2) Aprilia 65 (3) Honda 4

Rugby union
Amlin Challenge Cup Final in Marseille:
Cardiff Blues  28–21  Toulon
Cardiff Blues win their first Challenge Cup, becoming the first Welsh side to win any European club trophy.
IRB Sevens World Series:
London Sevens in London:
Shield:  21–24 
Bowl:  17–19 
Plate:  24–26 
Cup:  19–14 
Standings (after 7 of 8 events): (1)  140 points (2) New Zealand 133 (3) Australia & Fiji 102
 Rugby Pro D2 Promotion Final in Brive-la-Gaillarde:
Lyon 26–32 La Rochelle
La Rochelle joins regular-season champion Agen in the 2010–11 Top 14.

Tennis
Grand Slams:
French Open in Paris, France, day 1: (seeding in parentheses)
Men's Singles, first round:
Robin Söderling  [5] def. Laurent Recouderc  [WC] 6–0 6–2, 6–3
Jo-Wilfried Tsonga  [8] def. Daniel Brands  4–6, 6–3, 6–2, 6–7(2), 7–5
Marin Čilić  [10] def. Ricardo Mello  6–1, 3–6, 6–3, 6–1
Women's Singles, first round:
Venus Williams  [2] def. Patty Schnyder  6–3, 6–3
Svetlana Kuznetsova  [6] def. Sorana Cîrstea  6–3, 6–1
Gisela Dulko  def. Victoria Azarenka  [10] 6–1, 6–2

May 22, 2010 (Saturday)

Auto racing
NASCAR Sprint Cup Series:
NASCAR Sprint All-Star Race XXVI in Concord, North Carolina:
 (1)  Kurt Busch (Dodge, Penske Racing) (2)  Martin Truex Jr. (Toyota, Michael Waltrip Racing) (3)  Joey Logano (Toyota, Joe Gibbs Racing)
IndyCar Series:
Indianapolis 500 Qualifying in Speedway, Indiana:
 Front row: (1)  Hélio Castroneves (Team Penske) (2)  Will Power (Team Penske) (3)  Dario Franchitti (Chip Ganassi Racing)
 Three-time Indy 500 winner Castroneves claims his fourth pole in the race, tying him for second on the all-time list.

Basketball
FIBA Asia Champions Cup in Doha, Qatar:
Group A:
Astana Tigers  49–77  Mahram
Al-Rayyan  88–66  Duhok
Group B:
Al-Jalaa  77–87  Al-Riyadi
Al-Nasr  69–77  Al-Hilal
 NBA Playoffs (best-of-7 series):
Eastern Conference Finals:
Game 3: Boston Celtics 94, Orlando Magic 71. Celtics lead series 3–0.
 Turkish Basketball League Playoffs Finals (best-of-7 series):
Game 2: Efes Pilsen 73–64 Fenerbahçe Ülker. Series tied 1–1.
 National Basketball League Finals (best-of-5 series):
Game 2: Lukoil Academic 83–70 Levski Sofia. Lukoil Academic lead series 2–0.
 Dominet Bank Ekstraliga Final: (best-of-7 series):
Game 1: Asseco Prokom Gdynia 93–86 Anwil Włocławek. Asseco Prokom Gdynia lead series 1–0.
 Österreichische Basketball Bundesliga Final (best-of-5 series):
Game 2: Fürstenfeld 70–85 Gmunden. Series tied 1–1.
 Novo Basquete Brasil Finals (best-of-5 series):
Game 1: Flamengo 88–84 Universo/BRB. Flamengo lead series 1–0.

Cricket
South Africa in West Indies:
1st ODI in Port of Spain, Trinidad:
 280/7 (48/48 overs; Hashim Amla 102, AB de Villiers 102);  215 (44.1 overs). South Africa win by 66 runs (D/L), lead 5-match series 1–0.
New Zealand against Sri Lanka in USA:
1st T20I in Lauderhill, Florida:
 120/7 (20 overs);  92 (19.4 overs). New Zealand win by 28 runs, lead 2-match series 1–0.

Cycling
Grand Tours:
Giro d'Italia:
Stage 14:  Vincenzo Nibali  4h 57' 51"  Ivan Basso  + 23"  Michele Scarponi  + 23"
General classification: (1) David Arroyo   61h 22' 54" (2) Richie Porte   + 39" (3) Xavier Tondó  + 2' 12"
Tour of California:
Stage 7:  Tony Martin  41' 41"  Michael Rogers   + 22"  David Zabriskie  + 27"
General classification: (1) Rogers  29h 46' 06" (2) Zabriskie + 9" (3) Levi Leipheimer  + 25"

Equestrianism
Show jumping:
3rd Competition in La Mandria:  Marco Kutscher  on Cash  Nick Skelton  on Carlo  Rodrigo Pessoa  on Rebozo
Standings (after 3 of 9 competitions): (1) Kutscher 105 points (2) Marcus Ehning  90 (3) Patrick McEntee  70

Football (soccer)
Women's Asian Cup in Chengdu, China:
Group A: (teams in bold advance to semi-finals, teams in strike are eliminated)
 0–4 
 0–2 
Standings (after 2 matches): Japan, Korea DPR 6 points, Thailand, Myanmar 0.
UEFA Champions League Final in Madrid:
Bayern Munich  0–2  Internazionale
Internazionale win the title for the third time and the first since 1965, and becomes only the sixth team to complete a European continental treble.
José Mourinho becomes only the third manager to win two European Cup finals with different teams, after Ernst Happel and Ottmar Hitzfeld.
 Polish Cup Final in Bydgoszcz:
Pogoń Szczecin 0–1 Jagiellonia Białystok
Jagiellonia Białystok win the Cup for the first time.
 Nedbank Cup Final in Johannesburg:
AmaZulu 0–3 Bidvest Wits
Bidvest Wits win the Cup for the first time.
 Football League Championship play-off Final:
Blackpool 3–2 Cardiff City
The Seasiders earn promotion to the Premier League with the win, returning to the top flight for the first time in four decades.

Ice hockey
Men's World Championship in Germany:
Semi-finals:
 2–3 (SO) 
 2–1 
Stanley Cup playoffs (best-of-7 series):
Eastern Conference Finals:
Game 4: Philadelphia Flyers 3, Montreal Canadiens 0. Flyers lead series 3–1.

Rugby union
2011 Rugby World Cup qualifying:
Asian Five Nations: (team in bold advance to 2011 Rugby World Cup, team in italic advance to Final Place Play-off, team in strike relegated to Division One in 2011)
 94–5  in Tokyo
 25–32  in Incheon
Final standings: Japan 24 points, Kazakhstan 13, Hong Kong 12,  10, Korea 2.
European Nations Cup Champions Playoff Series:
Round 5, first leg:  3–33  in Kyiv
IRB Junior World Trophy in Moscow, Russia:
Pool A:
 42–14 
 30–7 
Standings (after 2 matches): Italy 10 points, Uruguay 6, Romania 4, Papua New Guinea 0.
Pool B:
 20–20 
 17–15 
Standings (after 2 matches): Japan 6 points, Canada 5, Russia 4, Zimbabwe 2.
Heineken Cup Final in Saint-Denis:
Biarritz  19–21  Toulouse
 Toulouse win their fourth Heineken Cup.
Super 14 finals series:
Semi-finals:
Bulls  39–24  Crusaders in Soweto
Stormers  26–6  Waratahs

Tennis
ATP World Tour:
World Team Cup in Düsseldorf, Germany:
Final:  def.  2–1
Juan Mónaco  def. Sam Querrey  1–6, 6–2, 6–3
Horacio Zeballos  def. Robby Ginepri  6–4, 6–7(7), 7–5
Bob Bryan / Mike Bryan  def. Eduardo Schwank / Diego Veronelli  6–1, 6–2
Argentina win the Cup for the fourth time.
Open de Nice Côte d'Azur in Nice, France:
Final: Richard Gasquet  def. Fernando Verdasco  6–3, 5–7, 7–6(5)
Gasquet wins his sixth career title.
WTA Tour:
Internationaux de Strasbourg in Strasbourg, France:
Final: Maria Sharapova  def. Kristina Barrois  7–5, 6–1
Sharapova wins her 22nd career title.
Polsat Warsaw Open in Warsaw, Poland:
Final: Alexandra Dulgheru  def. Zheng Jie  6–3, 6–4
Dulgheru wins her second career title, defending her Warsaw Open title.

May 21, 2010 (Friday)

Basketball
 Ukrainian SuperLeague Final (best-of-5 series):
Game 1: Budivelnyk Kyiv 66–80 Azovmash Mariupol. Azovmash Mariupol lead series 1–0.

Cycling
Grand Tours:
Giro d'Italia:
Stage 13:  Manuel Belletti  5h 27' 12"  Greg Henderson  s.t.  Iban Mayoz  s.t.
General classification: (1) Richie Porte   56h 20' 56" (2) David Arroyo  + 1' 42" (3) Robert Kišerlovski  + 1' 56"
Tour of California:
Stage 6:  Peter Sagan   6h 07' 08"  Rory Sutherland  s.t.  Michael Rogers   s.t.
General classification: (1) Rogers  29h 04' 03" (2) David Zabriskie  + 4" (3) Sagan  + 9"

Football (soccer)
Women's Asian Cup in Chengdu, China:
Group B: (teams in bold advance to semifinals, teams in strike are eliminated)
 1–3 
 0–5 
Standings (after 2 matches): Australia 6 points, China PR 4, Korea Republic 1, Vietnam 0.
European Under-17 Championship in Liechtenstein: (teams in bold advance to semifinals, teams in strike are eliminated)
Group A:
 4–0 
 1–0 
Standings (after 2 matches): Spain 6 points, France, Portugal 3, Switzerland 0.
Group B:
 1–1 
 0–1 
Standings (after 2 matches): England 6 points, Turkey 4, Czech Republic 1, Greece 0.

Handball
IHF Super Globe in Doha, Qatar:
Third place play-off: Al-Sadd  22–33   Zamalek
Final:  Ciudad Real  30–25   Al-Sadd
Ciudad Real wins the IHF Super Globe for the second consecutive time.

Ice hockey
Stanley Cup playoffs (best-of-7 series):
Western Conference Finals:
Game 3: Chicago Blackhawks 3, San Jose Sharks 2 (OT). Blackhawks lead series 3–0.
Memorial Cup in Brandon, Manitoba:
Semi-final: Brandon Wheat Kings 5, Calgary Hitmen 4 (OT).

May 20, 2010 (Thursday)

Basketball
 Turkish Basketball League Playoffs Finals: (best-of-7 series):
Game 1: Efes Pilsen 62–78 Fenerbahçe Ülker. Fenerbahçe Ülker lead series 1–0.
 National Basketball League Finals (best-of-5 series):
Game 1: Lukoil Academic 95–87 Levski Sofia. Lukoil Academic lead series 1–0.

Cricket
South Africa in West Indies:
2nd T20 in Port of Spain, Trinidad:
 120/7 (20 overs),  119/7 (20 overs). South Africa win by 1 run; win the 2-match series 2–0.

Cycling
Grand Tours:
Giro d'Italia:
Stage 12:  Filippo Pozzato  5h 15' 50"  Thomas Voeckler  s.t.  Jérôme Pineau  s.t.
General classification: (1) Richie Porte   50h 46' 16" (2) David Arroyo  + 1' 42" (3) Robert Kišerlovski  + 1' 56"
Tour of California:
Stage 5:  Peter Sagan   4h 52' 28"  Michael Rogers  s.t.  David Zabriskie   s.t.
General classification: (1) Rogers  22h 56' 59" (2) Zabriskie + 0" (3) Levi Leipheimer  + 10"
Floyd Landis, the initial winner of the 2006 Tour de France before being stripped of his title due to a doping case, admits to using performance-enhancing drugs during his career. Landis also accused former teammates Lance Armstrong, George Hincapie, Levi Leipheimer and David Zabriskie of using the banned drug EPO during the 2002 and 2003 seasons. (BBC, ESPN)

Football (soccer)
Women's Asian Cup in Chengdu, China:
Group A:
 3–0 
 8–0 
2011 FIFA Women's World Cup qualification (UEFA): (teams in strike are eliminated)
Group 4:  4–2 
Standings:  12 points (5 matches), Hungary 11 (6), Ukraine 7 (4),  7 (5),  0 (6).
Group 5:  0–6 
Standings: England 15 points (5 matches),  15 (6),  6 (5),  3 (4), Malta 0 (6).
2011 UEFA European Under-21 Championship qualification:
Group 2:  2–3 
Standings:  16 points (7 matches),  10 (6), Armenia 10 (8), Estonia 9 (8),  8 (6),  4 (7).
UEFA Women's Champions League Final in Getafe, Spain:
Lyon  0–0 (6–7 pen.)  Turbine Potsdam
Turbine Potsdam win the UEFA Women's Champions League for the second time.
Copa Libertadores Quarterfinals, second leg: (first leg score in parentheses)
Universidad de Chile  1–2 (3–2)  Flamengo. 3–3 on points; Universidad de Chile win on away goals.
Estudiantes  2–1 (0–1)  Internacional. 3–3 on points; Internacional win on away goals.
 Primera División de México Bicentenario Liguilla Final, first leg:
Santos Laguna 2–2 Toluca

Ice hockey
Men's World Championship in Germany:
Quarter-finals:
 4–2 
 1–2 (SO) 
 5–2 
 0–1 
Stanley Cup playoffs (best-of-7 series):
Eastern Conference Finals:
Game 3: Montreal Canadiens 5, Philadelphia Flyers 1. Flyers lead series 2–1.

May 19, 2010 (Wednesday)

Basketball
 NBA Playoffs (best-of-7 series):
Western Conference Finals:
Game 2: Los Angeles Lakers 124, Phoenix Suns 112. Lakers lead series 2–0.
 Österreichische Basketball Bundesliga Final (best-of-5 series):
Game 1: Fürstenfeld 80–79 Gmunden. Fürstenfeld lead series 1–0.

Cricket
South Africa in West Indies:
1st T20 in Port of Spain, Trinidad:
 136/7 (20 overs);  123 (19.5 overs). South Africa win by 13 runs; lead 2-match series 1–0.

Cycling
Grand Tours:
Giro d'Italia:
Stage 11:  Evgeni Petrov  6h 28' 29"  Dario Cataldo  + 5"  Carlos Sastre  + 5"
General classification: (1) Richie Porte   45h 30' 16" (2) David Arroyo  + 1' 42" (3) Robert Kišerlovski  + 1' 56"
Tour of California:
Stage 4:  Francesco Chicchi  4h 55' 02"  Juan José Haedo  s.t.  Mark Cavendish   s.t.
General classification: (1) David Zabriskie   18h 04' 35" (2) Michael Rogers  + 4" (3) Levi Leipheimer  + 6"

Football (soccer)
Women's Asian Cup in Chengdu, China:
Group B:
 2–0 
 0–0 
2011 UEFA European Under-21 Championship qualification: (teams in strike are eliminated)
Group 7:  1–1 
Standings: Croatia 13 points (6 matches), Slovakia 11 (6),  9 (5),  4 (5),  3 (6).
Copa Libertadores Quarterfinals, second leg: (first leg score in parentheses)
São Paulo  2–0 (2–0)  Cruzeiro. São Paulo progress 6–0 on points.
 Kup Bosne i Hercegovine Final, second leg: (first leg score in parentheses)
Željezničar 2–2 (1–1) Borac. 3–3 on aggregate; Borac win on away goals.
Borac win the Cup for the first time.
 Latvian Cup Final in Riga:
Jelgava 2–2 (6–5 pen.) Jūrmala
Jelgava win the Cup for the fourth time.
 Montenegrin Cup Final in Podgorica:
Rudar 2–1 Budućnost
Rudar win the Cup for the second time.
 Copa del Rey Final in Barcelona:
Sevilla 2–0 Atlético Madrid
Sevilla win the Copa del Rey for the fifth time.

Ice hockey
Memorial Cup in Brandon, Manitoba (team in bold advances to the Championship Game, teams in italics advance to the semi-final):
Round Robin:
Calgary Hitmen 5, Brandon Wheat Kings 1.
Final standings: Windsor Spitfires 6 points, Calgary Hitmen 4, Brandon Wheat Kings 2, Moncton Wildcats 0.

Rugby union
 RFU Championship Final, first leg:
Exeter Chiefs 9–6 Bristol

May 18, 2010 (Tuesday)

Basketball
 NBA Playoffs (best-of-7 series):
Eastern Conference Finals:
Game 2: Boston Celtics 95, Orlando Magic 92. Celtics lead series 2–0.
NBA Draft Lottery:
The Washington Wizards will have the first overall pick in the NBA Draft on June 24. The Philadelphia 76ers will have the second pick and the New Jersey Nets will have the third selection.

Cycling
Grand Tours:
Giro d'Italia:
Stage 10:  Tyler Farrar   5h 49' 14"  Fabio Sabatini  s.t.  Julian Dean  s.t.
General classification: (1) Alexander Vinokourov   38h 59' 00" (2) Cadel Evans  + 1' 12" (3) Vincenzo Nibali  + 1' 33"
Tour of California:
Stage 3:  David Zabriskie  4h 26' 09"  Michael Rogers  s.t.  Levi Leipheimer  s.t.
General classification: (1) Zabriskie  13h 09' 33" (2) Rogers + 4" (3) Leipheimer + 6"

Football (soccer)
European Under-17 Championship in Liechtenstein:
Group A:
 1–2 
 3–0 
Group B:
 1–3 
 3–1 
Copa Libertadores Quarterfinals, second leg: (first leg score in parentheses)
Libertad  2–0 (0–3)  Guadalajara. 3–3 on points; Guadalajara win on goal difference (3–2).
 Uruguayan Primera División Finals, second leg: (first leg score in parentheses)
Peñarol 1–1 (1–0) Nacional. Peñarol win 2–1 on aggregate.
Peñarol win the championship for the 41st time.
 Czech Republic Cup Final in Prague:
Jablonec 1–2 Viktoria Plzeň
Viktoria Plzeň win the Cup for the first time.

Ice hockey
Men's World Championship in Germany:
Group E in Cologne: (teams in bold advance to the quarter-finals)
 1–2 
 5–0 
Final standings: Russia 15 points, Finland 9, Germany 7,  6,  5, Slovakia 3.
Group F in Mannheim: (teams in bold advance to the quarter-finals)
 2–3 
 0–5 
Final standings: Sweden 12 points, Switzerland, Czech Republic 9, Canada,  6,  3.
Relegation Round: (teams in strike are relegated to Division I in 2011)
 3–2 (SO) 
 3–5 
Final standings: United States 8 points, France 6, Italy 4, Kazakhstan 0.
Stanley Cup playoffs (all series best-of-7):
Eastern Conference Finals:
Game 2: Philadelphia Flyers 3, Montreal Canadiens 0. Flyers lead series 2–0.
Western Conference Finals:
Game 2: Chicago Blackhawks 4, San Jose Sharks 2. Blackhawks lead series 2–0.
Memorial Cup in Brandon, Manitoba: (team in bold advances to the Championship Game, teams in italics advance to the semi-final)
Round Robin:
Windsor Spitfires 4, Moncton Wildcats 3 (OT)
Standings: Windsor Spitfires 6 points (3 matches), Brandon Wheat Kings, Calgary Hitmen 2 (2), Moncton Wildcats 0 (3).

Rugby union
IRB Junior World Trophy in Moscow, Russia:
Pool A:
 0–74 
 12–15 
Pool B:
 22–6 
 17–31

May 17, 2010 (Monday)

Basketball
 NBA Playoffs (best-of-7 series):
Western Conference Finals:
Game 1: Los Angeles Lakers 128, Phoenix Suns 107. Lakers lead series 1–0.

Cycling
Grand Tours:
Giro d'Italia:
Stage 9:  Matthew Goss  4h 08' 17"  Filippo Pozzato  s.t.  Tyler Farrar  s.t.
General classification: (1) Alexander Vinokourov   33h 09' 43" (2) Cadel Evans  + 1' 12" (3) Vincenzo Nibali  + 1' 33"
Tour of California:
Stage 2:  Brett Lancaster  4h 38' 48"  Peter Sagan  s.t.  Lars Boom  s.t.
General classification: (1) Lancaster  8h 43' 24" (2) Sagan  + 4" (3) Karl Menzies  + 4"

Ice hockey
Men's World Championship in Germany:
Group E in Cologne: (teams in bold advance to the quarterfinals, teams in strike are eliminated)
 5–2 
 2–1 
Standings:  12 points (4 games), Finland 9 (4), Denmark 6 (5), Belarus 5 (5),  4 (4), Slovakia 3 (4).
Group F in Mannheim: (teams in bold advance to the quarterfinals, teams in strike are eliminated)
 3–2 
 3–1 
Standings: , Switzerland 9 points (4 games), Czech Republic 6 (4), Norway 6 (5), Latvia 3 (5).
Memorial Cup in Brandon, Manitoba:
Round Robin:
Windsor Spitfires 6, Calgary Hitmen 2
Standings (after 2 matches): Windsor Spitfires 4 points, Brandon Wheat Kings, Calgary Hitmen 2, Moncton Wildcats 0.

May 16, 2010 (Sunday)

Auto racing
Formula One:
Monaco Grand Prix in Monte Carlo, Monaco:
(1) Mark Webber  (Red Bull–Renault) (2) Sebastian Vettel  (Red Bull-Renault) (3) Robert Kubica  (Renault)
Drivers' championship standings (after 6 of 19 races): (1) Webber & Vettel 78 points (3) Fernando Alonso  (Ferrari) 75
Constructors' championship standings: (1) Red Bull 156 (2) Ferrari 136 (3) McLaren 129
NASCAR Sprint Cup Series:
Autism Speaks 400 in Dover, Delaware:
(1)  Kyle Busch (Toyota, Joe Gibbs Racing) (2)  Jeff Burton (Chevrolet, Richard Childress Racing) (3)  Matt Kenseth (Ford, Roush Fenway Racing)
Drivers' championship standings (after 12 of 36 races): (1)  Kevin Harvick (Chevrolet, Richard Childress Racing) 1768 points (2) Busch 1699 (3) Kenseth 1642
V8 Supercars:
Winton V8 Supercar Event at Winton Motor Raceway, Benalla, Victoria:
Race 12: (1) James Courtney  (Ford Falcon) (2) Craig Lowndes  (Holden Commodore) (3) Lee Holdsworth  (Holden Commodore)
Drivers' championship standings (after 12 of 26 races): (1) Courtney 1467 points (2) Jamie Whincup  (Holden Commodore) 1353 (3) Lowndes 1245

Badminton
Thomas & Uber Cup in Kuala Lumpur, Malaysia:
Thomas Cup:
Final:  3–0 
China win the Cup for the fourth straight time and eighth overall.

Basketball
 NBA Playoffs (best-of-7 series):
Eastern Conference Finals:
Game 1: Boston Celtics 92, Orlando Magic 88. Celtics lead series 1–0.

Cricket
ICC Men's World Twenty20 in West Indies:
Final in Bridgetown, Barbados:
 147/6 (20 overs);  148/3 (17 overs). England win by 7 wickets.
ICC Women's World Twenty20 in West Indies:
Final in Bridgetown, Barbados:
 106/8 (20 overs);  103/6 (20 overs). Australia win by 3 runs.

Cycling
Grand Tours:
Giro d'Italia:
Stage 8:  Chris Anker Sørensen  4h 50' 48"  Simone Stortoni  + 30"  Xavier Tondó  + 36"
General classification: (1) Alexander Vinokourov   29h 01' 26" (2) Cadel Evans   + 1' 12" (3) Vincenzo Nibali  + 1' 33"
Tour of California:
Stage 1:  Mark Cavendish   4h 04' 36"  Juan José Haedo  + 4"  Alexander Kristoff   + 6"

Equestrianism
Show jumping:
Grand Prix de la ville de la Baule, La Baule-Escoublac (CSIO 5*):  McLain Ward  on Sapphire  Mario Deslauriers  on Urico  Jesus Garmendia Echevarria  on Lord du Mont Milon
German show jumping derby (de:Deutsches Spring-Derby), Hamburg:  Carsten-Otto Nagel  on Lex Lugar  Heiko Schmidt  on Coverlady  Bernardo Alves  on Quentin

Football (soccer)
 Argentine Primera División – Clausura, final matchday:
(9) Huracán 1–2 (1) Argentinos Juniors
(14) Colón 1–4 (2) Estudiantes (LP)
Final standings: Argentinos Juniors 41 points, Estudiantes 40, Godoy Cruz 37.
Argentinos Juniors win the championship for the third time.
 Serie A, final matchday: (teams in bold qualify for the Champions League, teams in italics qualify for Europa League)
(19) Siena 0–1 (1) Internazionale
(13) Chievo 0–2 (2) Roma
(4) Sampdoria 1–0 (6) Napoli
(18) Atalanta 1–2 (5) Palermo
Final standings: Internazionale 82 points, Roma 80, Milan 70, Sampdoria 67, Palermo 65, Napoli 59, Juventus 55.
Internazionale win the championship for the fifth straight time and 18th overall.
 La Liga, final matchday: (teams in bold qualify for the Champions League, teams in italics qualify for Europa League)
(1) Barcelona 4–0 (16) Valladolid
(18) Málaga 1–1 (2) Real Madrid
Final standings: Barcelona 99 points, Real Madrid 96, Valencia 71, Sevilla 63, Mallorca 62, Getafe 58.
Barcelona win the championship for the 20th time.
 Swiss Super League, final matchday: (teams in bold qualify for the Champions League, teams in italics qualify for Europa League)
(2) Young Boys 0–2 (1) Basel
Final standings: Basel 80 points, Young Boys 77, Grasshopper 65, Luzern 58.
Basel win the championship for the 13th time.
 Süper Lig, final matchday: (teams in bold qualify for the Champions League, teams in italics qualify for Europa League)
(1) Fenerbahçe 1–1 (5) Trabzonspor
(2) Bursaspor 2–1 (4) Beşiktaş
Final standings: Bursaspor 75 points, Fenerbahçe 74, Galatasaray, Beşiktaş 64, Trabzonspor 57.
Bursaspor win the championship for the first time.
 Copa Constitució Final in Aixovall:
UE Sant Julià 1–0 UE Santa Coloma
UE Sant Julià win the Cup for the second time.
 Austrian Cup Final in Klagenfurt:
Wiener Neustadt 0–1 Sturm Graz
Sturm Graz win the Cup for the fourth time.
 Taça de Portugal Final in Jamor:
Chaves 1–2 Porto
Porto win the Cup for the 19th time.
 Russian Cup Final in Rostov-na-Donu:
Sibir Novosibirsk 0–1 Zenit Saint Petersburg
Zenit Saint Petersburg win the Cup for the second time.
 Ukrainian Cup Final in Kharkiv:
Tavriya Simferopol 3–2 (a.e.t.) Metalurh Donetsk
Tavriya Simferopol win the Cup for the first time.

Golf
PGA Tour:
Valero Texas Open in San Antonio, Texas:
Winner: Adam Scott  274 (−14)
Scott wins his seventh PGA Tour title.
European Tour:
Open Calla Millor Mallorca in Spain:
Winner: Peter Hanson  274 (−6)PO
Hanson wins his third European Tour title.
LPGA Tour:
Bell Micro LPGA Classic in Mobile, Alabama:
Winner: Se Ri Pak  203 (−13)PO
Pak wins her 25th LPGA Tour title.
Champions Tour:
Regions Charity Classic in Hoover, Alabama:
Winner: Dan Forsman  196 (−20)
Forsman wins his second Champions Tour title.

Ice hockey
Men's World Championship in Germany:
Group E in Cologne: (teams in bold advance to the quarterfinals, teams in strike are eliminated)
 1–6 
 1–2 (OT) 
Standings: Russia 12 points (4 games),  6 (3), Denmark 6 (4), Germany 4 (4),  3 (3), Belarus 2 (4).
Group F in Mannheim: (teams in bold advance to the quarterfinals)
 5–0 
 3–1 
Standings:  9 points (3 games), Sweden 9 (4), Canada 6 (4),  3 (3), Latvia, Norway 3 (4).
Relegation Round:
 0–4 
 2–1 
Standings (after 2 games): United States 6 points, France, Italy 3, Kazakhstan 0.
Stanley Cup playoffs (best-of-7 series):
Western Conference Finals:
Game 1: (2) Chicago Blackhawks 2, (1) San Jose Sharks 1. Blackhawks lead series 1–0.
Eastern Conference Finals:
Game 1: (7) Philadelphia Flyers 6, (8) Montreal Canadiens 0. Flyers lead series 1–0.
Memorial Cup in Brandon, Manitoba:
Round Robin:
Brandon Wheat Kings 4, Moncton Wildcats 0
Standings: Windsor Spitfires, Calgary Hitmen 2 points (1 match), Brandon Wheat Kings 2 (2), Moncton Wildcats 0 (2).

Motorcycle racing
Superbike:
Kyalami Superbike World Championship round in Midrand, South Africa:
Race 1: (1) Michel Fabrizio  (Ducati 1098R) (2) Carlos Checa  (Ducati 1098R) (3) Leon Haslam  (Suzuki GSX-R1000)
Race 2: (1) Haslam (2) Jonathan Rea  (Honda CBR1000RR) (3) Max Biaggi  (Aprilia RSV 4)
Riders' championship standings (after 6 of 13 rounds): (1) Haslam 222 points (2) Biaggi 207 (3) Rea & Checa 141
Manufacturers' championship standings: (1) Suzuki 222 points (2) Aprilia 213 (3) Ducati 185
Supersport:
Kyalami Supersport World Championship round in Midrand, South Africa:
(1) Eugene Laverty  (Honda CBR600RR) (2) Kenan Sofuoğlu  (Honda CBR600RR) (3) Chaz Davies  (Triumph Daytona 675)
Riders' championship standings (after 6 of 13 rounds): (1) Sofuoğlu 117 points (2) Laverty 116 (3) Joan Lascorz  (Kawasaki Ninja ZX-6R) 112
Manufacturers' championship standings: (1) Honda 145 points (2) Kawasaki 112 (3) Triumph 81

Rugby union
 Guinness Premiership playoffs:
Semi-finals:
Northampton Saints 19–21 Saracens
Leicester Tigers 15–6 Bath

Tennis
ATP World Tour:
Mutua Madrileña Madrid Open in Madrid, Spain:
Final: Rafael Nadal  def. Roger Federer  6–4, 7–6(5)
Nadal wins his 39th career title and his 18th Masters title, the most by any male player; overtaking Andre Agassi in the process.
WTA Tour:
Mutua Madrileña Madrid Open in Madrid, Spain:
Final: Aravane Rezaï  def. Venus Williams  6–2, 7–5
Rezaï wins her third career title and first Premier event.

May 15, 2010 (Saturday)

Auto racing
Nationwide Series:
Heluva Good! 200 in Dover, Delaware: (1)  Kyle Busch (Toyota; Joe Gibbs Racing) (2)  Ryan Newman (Chevrolet; Phoenix Racing) (3)  Jamie McMurray (Chevrolet; JR Motorsports)
Drivers' championship standings (after 11 of 35 races): (1)  Brad Keselowski (Dodge; Penske Racing) 1766 points (2) Busch 1755 (3)  Kevin Harvick (Chevrolet; Kevin Harvick Incorporated) 1702
V8 Supercars:
Winton V8 Supercar Event at Winton Motor Raceway, Benalla, Victoria:
Race 11: (1) James Courtney  (Ford Falcon) (2) Craig Lowndes  (Holden Commodore) (3) Jamie Whincup  (Holden Commodore)
Drivers' championship standings (after 11 of 26 races): (1) Whincup 1320 points (2) Courtney 1317 (3) Lowndes 1107

Badminton
Thomas & Uber Cup in Kuala Lumpur, Malaysia:
Uber Cup:
Final:  1–3 
Korea win the Cup for the first time and stop China's streak of six successive wins.

Cycling
Grand Tours:
Giro d'Italia:
Stage 7:  Cadel Evans  5h 13' 37"  Damiano Cunego  + 2"  Alexander Vinokourov  + 2"
General classification: (1) Vinokourov  24h 09' 42" (2) Evans + 1' 12" (3) David Millar  + 1' 29"

Equestrianism
Show jumping:
Global Champions Tour:
2nd Competition in Hamburg:  Lauren Hough  on Quick Study  Edwina Alexander  on Itot du Château  Laura Kraut  on Cedric
Standings (after 2 of 9 competitions): (1) Marcus Ehning  66 points, (2) Marco Kutscher  65 (3) Kraut 54

Football (soccer)
 Gambrinus liga, final matchday: (teams in bold qualify for the Champions League, teams in italics qualify for Europa League)
(1) Sparta Prague 1–0 (4) Teplice
(9) Příbram 1–1 (2) Baník Ostrava
(3) Jablonec 2–0 (12) Dynamo České Budějovice
Final standings: Sparta Prague 62 points, Jablonec 61, Baník Ostrava 60 points, Teplice 55.
Sparta Prague win the national championship for the 35th time.
 Ligue 1, final matchday: (teams in bold qualify for the Champions League, teams in italics qualify for Europa League)
(1) Marseille 2–0 (20) Grenoble
(7) Lorient 2–1 (2) Lille
(3) Lyon 2–0 (18) Le Mans
(16) Sochaux 1–2 (4) Auxerre
(11) Paris Saint-Germain 1–3 (5) Montpellier
(14) Lens 4–3 (6) Bordeaux
Final standings: Marseille 78 points, Lyon 72, Auxerre 71, Lille 70, Montpellier 69, Bordeaux 64.
Marseille win the championship for the tenth time.
 Israeli Premier League, final matchday: (teams in bold qualify for the Champions League, teams in italics qualify for Europa League)
(4) Bnei Yehuda 1–1 (1) Maccabi Haifa
(5) Beitar Jerusalem 1–2 (2) Hapoel Tel Aviv
Final standings: Hapoel Tel Aviv 49 points (goal difference +61), Maccabi Haifa 49 (GD +56), Maccabi Tel Aviv 34, Bnei Yehuda 31.
Hapoel Tel Aviv win the championship for the 13th time.
 Ekstraklasa, final matchday: (teams in bold qualify for the Champions League, teams in italics qualify for Europa League)
(1) Lech Poznań 2–0 (6) Zagłębie Lubin
(2) Wisła Kraków 1–1 (16) Odra Wodzisław
(7) Korona Kielce 3–0 (3) Ruch Chorzów
(4) Legia Warsaw 2–2 (5) GKS Bełchatów
Final standings: Lech Poznań 65 points, Wisła Kraków 62, Ruch Chorzów 53, Legia Warsaw 52.
Lech Poznań win the championship for the sixth time.
 Liga I, matchday 33 of 34: (teams in bold qualify for the Champions League, teams in italics qualify for Europa League)
(1) CFR Cluj 2–1 (12) Internațional Curtea de Argeș
Standings: CFR Cluj 66 points (33 matches), Unirea Urziceni 60 (32).
CFR Cluj win the championship for the second time.
 La Liga, final matchday: (teams in bold qualify for the Champions League, teams in italics qualify for Europa League)
(12) Almería 2–3 (4) Sevilla
(5) Mallorca 2–0 (11) Espanyol
(9) Atlético Madrid 0–3 (6) Getafe
(15) Zaragoza 3–3 (7) Villarreal
Standings (after 38 matches): Barcelona 96 points (37 matches), Real Madrid 95 (37), Valencia 68 (37), Sevilla 63, Mallorca 62, Getafe 58, Villarreal 56.
 Uruguayan Primera División Finals, first leg:
Nacional 0–1 Peñarol
 Belgian Cup Final in Brussels:
Gent 3–0 Cercle Brugge
Gent win the Cup for the third time.
 Cypriot Cup Final in Larnaca:
APOEL 1–2 Apollon
Apollon win the Cup for the sixth time.
 FA Cup Final in London:
Chelsea 1–0 Portsmouth
Chelsea win the Cup for the sixth time.
 DFB-Pokal Final in Berlin:
Werder Bremen 0–4 Bayern Munich
Bayern Munich win the Cup for the 15th time.
 Frauen DFB-Pokal Final in Cologne:
FCR 2001 Duisburg 1–0 FF USV Jena
FCR 2001 Duisburg win the Cup for the third time.
 Lithuanian Cup Final in Kaunas:
Ekranas Panevėžys 2–1 Vėtra Vilnius
Ekranas Panevėžys win the Cup for the fourth time.
 Scottish Cup Final in Glasgow:
Ross County 0–3 Dundee United
Dundee United win the Cup for the second time.
Motherwell qualify for the Europa League.

Handball
EHF Women's Champions League Final, second leg: (first leg score in parentheses)
CS Oltchim Râmnicu Vâlcea  31–32 (21–28)  Viborg HK. Viborg HK win 60–52 on aggregate.
Viborg HK win the title for the third time.

Horse racing
U.S. Triple Crown:
Preakness Stakes in Baltimore:  Lookin at Lucky (trainer: Bob Baffert; jockey: Martín García)  First Dude (trainer: Dale L. Romans; jockey: Ramon A. Dominguez)  Jackson Bend (trainer: Nick Zito; jockey: Mike E. Smith)
Lookin at Lucky pulls an upset victory in the second race of the Triple Crown. 2010 Kentucky Derby winner Super Saver's loss assures the continuation of horse racing's longest losing streak of 32 years; Affirmed last won the elusive Triple Crown in 1978.

Ice hockey
Men's World Championship in Germany:
Group E in Cologne: (teams in bold advance to the quarterfinals)
 3–2 
Standings (after 3 games): Russia 9 points, Denmark, Finland 6, Germany, Slovakia 3, Belarus 0.
Group F in Mannheim:
 3–2 
Standings (after 3 games): Switzerland 9 points, Canada, Sweden 6, Norway, Czech Republic 3, Latvia 0.
Relegation Round:
 10–0 
 1–2 
Memorial Cup in Brandon, Manitoba:
Round Robin:
Calgary Hitmen 5, Moncton Wildcats 4

Rugby union
2011 Rugby World Cup qualifying:
Asian Five Nations: (teams in strike are eliminated)
 7–101  in Tokyo
Standings: Japan 18 points (3 matches),  12 (3),  10 (4), Kazakhstan 7 (3),  1 (3).
Celtic League playoffs:
Semi-finals:
Leinster  16–6  Munster
 Top 14 playoffs:
Semi-finals:
Toulon 29–35 (aet) Clermont in Saint-Étienne

Taekwondo
European Championships in Saint Petersburg, Russia:
Men:
−87 kg:  Carlo Molfetta   Agustin Bata   Jon García Aguado   Ivan Nikitin 
+87 kg:  Tavakgul Bayramov   Zakaria Asidah   Mickael Borot   Alexandros Nikolaidis 
Women:
−73 kg:  Anastasia Baryshnikova   Sandra Lorenzo Rodelas   Nusa Rajher   Gwladys Épangue 
+73 kg:  Rosana Simon Alamo   Anne Caroline Graffe   Iwona Kosiorek   Bianca Walkden

May 14, 2010 (Friday)

Athletics
IAAF Diamond League:
Qatar Athletic Super Grand Prix in Doha, Qatar:
Men:
100m: Asafa Powell  9.81
800m: David Rudisha  1:43.00
5000m: Eliud Kipchoge  12:51.22
400m Hurdles: Bershawn Jackson  48.66
3000m Steeplechase: Ezekiel Kemboi  8:06.28
Triple Jump: Alexis Copello  17.47 m
Shot Put: Christian Cantwell  21.82 m
Women:
200m: Kerron Stewart  22.34
400m: Allyson Felix  50.15
1500m: Nancy Jebet Langat  4:01.64
100m Hurdles: Lolo Jones  12.63
High Jump: Blanka Vlašić  1.98 m
Pole Vault: Silke Spiegelburg  4.70 m
Discus Throw: Yarelis Barrios  64.90 m
Javelin Throw: Maria Abakumova  68.89 m

Badminton
Thomas & Uber Cup in Kuala Lumpur, Malaysia:
Thomas Cup:
Semi-finals:
 3–0 
 1–3

Basketball
Atlanta Hawks head coach Mike Woodson is dismissed, after the team's second-round playoff exit to the Orlando Magic. (NBA)

Cricket
ICC Men's World Twenty20 in West Indies:
Semi-finals in Gros Islet, St Lucia:
 191/6 (20 overs);  197/7 (19.5 overs). Australia win by 3 wickets.
ICC Women's World Twenty20 in West Indies:
Semi-finals in Gros Islet, St Lucia:
 180/5 (20 overs);  124/8 (20 overs). New Zealand win by 56 runs.

Cycling
Grand Tours:
Giro d'Italia:
Stage 6:  Matthew Lloyd  4h 24' 20"  Rubens Bertogliati  + 1' 06"  Danilo Hondo  + 1' 15"
General classification: (1) Vincenzo Nibali   18h 55' 38" (2) Ivan Basso  + 13" (3) Valerio Agnoli   + 20"

Equestrianism
Show jumping
Meydan FEI Nations Cup:
FEI Nations Cup of France in La Baule-Escoublac (CSIO 5*):   (Penelope Leprevost on Topinambour, Michel Robert on Kellemoi de Pepita, Olivier Guillon on Lord de Theize, Kevin Staut on Kraque Boom)   (Richard Spooner on Cristallo, Hillary Dobbs on Quincy B, Mario Deslauriers on Urico, McLain Ward on Sapphire)   (Michael Whitaker on Amai, Scott Brash on Intertoy Z, Mark Armstrong on Thesaura, Peter Charles on Pom d'Ami)   (Alois Pollmann-Schweckhorst on Chacco Blue, Alexander Hufenstuhl on Lacapo, Rebecca Golasch on Lassen Peak, Philipp Weishaupt on Souvenir)
FEI Nations Cup Promotional League:
FEI Nations Cup of Austria in Linz-Ebelsberg (CSIO 3*):      
FEI Nations Cup of Greece in the Markopoulo Olympic Equestrian Centre (CSIO 2*-W):        
Standings (after 4 of 11 competitions): (1)  25 points (2)  25 (3)  24

Ice hockey
Men's World Championship in Germany:
Group E in Cologne:
 0–6 
 2–0 
Standings:  6 points (2 matches), Denmark, Finland 6 (3),  3 (2), Slovakia 3 (3), Belarus 0 (3).
Group F in Mannheim:
 12–1 
 4–2 
Standings:  6 points (2 matches), Canada, Sweden 6 (3),  3 (2), Norway 3 (3), Latvia 0 (3).
Stanley Cup playoffs (best-of-7 series):
Eastern Conference Semifinals:
Game 7: (7) Philadelphia Flyers 4, (6) Boston Bruins 3. Flyers win series 4–3.
The Flyers become only the third team in NHL history, and the first since the 1975 New York Islanders, to come back from being down 3–0 to win a playoff series.
Memorial Cup in Brandon, Manitoba:
Round Robin:
Windsor Spitfires 9, Brandon Wheat Kings 3

Rugby union
2011 Rugby World Cup qualifying:
Asian Five Nations: (teams in strike are eliminated)
Arabian Gulf  21–19  in Dubai, UAE
The Arabian Gulf win their final Test match. The team and governing body will both disband, with the member nations forming their own governing bodies.
Standings:  12 points (2 matches),  12 (3), Arabian Gulf 10 (4),  7 (2), Korea 1 (3)
Celtic League playoffs:
Semi-finals:
Ospreys  20–5  Glasgow Warriors
 Top 14 playoffs:
Semi-finals:
Perpignan 21–13 Toulouse in Montpellier

Taekwondo
European Championships in Saint Petersburg, Russia:
Men:
−74 kg:  Ridvan Baygut   Manuel Mark   Mokdad Ounis   Elvin Mammadov 
−80 kg:  Aaron Cock   Nikolaos Tzellos   Mamedy Doucara   Lukasz Smigaj 
Women:
−62 kg:  Haby Niare   Margarita Michailidou   Kristina Khafizova   Estefania Hernandez Garcia 
−67 kg:  Sarah Stevenson   Nur Tatar   Helena Fromm   Marlene Harnois

May 13, 2010 (Thursday)

Badminton
Thomas & Uber Cup in Kuala Lumpur, Malaysia:
Uber Cup:
Semi-finals:
 3–0 
 3–1

Baseball
 The Kansas City Royals fire manager Trey Hillman; Ned Yost will move from the Royals' front office to serve as interim replacement for the rest of the season.

Basketball
 NBA Playoffs (best-of-7 series):
Eastern Conference Semifinals:
Game 6: Boston Celtics 94, Cleveland Cavaliers 85. Celtics win series 4–2.

Cricket
ICC Men's World Twenty20 in West Indies:
Semi-finals in Gros Islet, St Lucia:
 128/6 (20 overs);  132/3 (16 overs). England win by 7 wickets.
ICC Women's World Twenty20 in West Indies:
Semi-finals in Gros Islet, St Lucia:
 119/5 (20 overs);  123/3 (18.5 overs). Australia win by 7 wickets.

Cycling
Grand Tours:
Giro d'Italia:
Stage 5:  Jérôme Pineau  3h 45' 59"  Julien Fouchard  s.t.  Yukiya Arashiro  s.t.
General classification: (1) Vincenzo Nibali   14h 30' 03" (2) Ivan Basso  + 13" (3) Valerio Agnoli   + 20"

Darts
Premier League round 14 in Nottingham, England: (players in bold advance to semi-finals)
Terry Jenkins  5–8 James Wade 
Ronnie Baxter  2–8 Raymond van Barneveld 
Simon Whitlock  8–2 Mervyn King 
Phil Taylor  8–1 Adrian Lewis 
High checkout: Whitlock 130
Final standings: Taylor 26 points, Whitlock 16, Wade 14, King, Baxter 13, Lewis 11, Barneveld 11, Jenkins 8.

Football (soccer)
Copa Libertadores Quarterfinals, first leg:
Internacional  1–0  Estudiantes
 Austrian Bundesliga, final matchday: (teams in bold qualify for the Champions League, teams in italics qualify for Europa League)
(4) Sturm Graz 0–2 (1) Red Bull Salzburg
(2) Austria Wien 2–0 (8) Ried
(6) Mattersburg 1–3 (3) Rapid Wien
Final standings: Red Bull Salzburg 76 points, Austria Wien 75, Rapid Wien 73.
Red Bull Salzburg win the championship for the second straight time and sixth time overall.
 Serbian SuperLiga, matchday 29 of 30: (teams in bold qualify for the Champions League, teams in italics qualify for Europa League)
(3) OFK Beograd 0–3 (1) Partizan
(2) Red Star Belgrade 1–3 (13) BSK Borča
Standings: Partizan 75 points, Red Star 68, OFK Beograd 50, Spartak Zlatibor Voda 49.
Partizan win the championship for the third straight time and the 22nd time overall (including former Yugoslavia and Serbia&Montenegro).
 Danish Cup Final in Copenhagen:
Midtjylland 0–2 (a.e.t.) Nordsjælland
Nordsjælland win the Cup for the first time.
 Liechtenstein Cup Final in Vaduz:
Vaduz 1–1 (4–2 pen.) Eschen/Mauren
Vaduz win the Cup for the 39th time and the 13th in succession.

Ice hockey
Men's World Championship in Germany:
Group A in Cologne: (teams in bold advance to the Qualification Round)
 3–1 
 1–5 
Final standings: Russia 9 points, Slovakia 6, Belarus 3, Kazakhstan 0.
Group C in Mannheim: (teams in bold advance to the Qualification Round)
 1–5 
 1–2 
Final standings: Sweden, Norway, Czech Republic 6 points, France 0.

Taekwondo
European Championships in Saint Petersburg, Russia:
Men:
−63 kg:  Konstantinos Konstantinidis   Nikola Jovanović   Vladislav Arventil   Cem Ulugnoyan 
−68 kg:  Servet Tazegül   Filip Grgic   Dennis Beckers   Vasily Nikitin 
Women:
−53 kg:  Floriane Liborio   Jennifer Agren   Jade Jones   Manuela Bezzola 
−57 kg:  Bat-El Gatterer   Yuliya Podolyan   Deborah Louz   Veronica Calabrese

May 12, 2010 (Wednesday)

Badminton
Thomas & Uber Cup in Kuala Lumpur, Malaysia:
Thomas Cup:
Quarter-finals:
 3–0 
 2–3 
 1–3 
 0–3 
Uber Cup:
Quarter-finals:
 3–0 
 3–0 
 1–3 
 1–3

Cycling
Grand Tours:
Giro d'Italia:
Stage 4:   36' 37"   + 13"   + 21"
General classification: (1) Vincenzo Nibali   10h 44' 00" (2) Ivan Basso  + 13" (3) Valerio Agnoli   + 20"

Football (soccer)
UEFA Europa League Final in Hamburg:
Fulham  1–2 (a.e.t.)  Atlético Madrid
Diego Forlán's goal four minutes from the end of extra time gives Atlético Madrid their first European title since the now-defunct UEFA Cup Winners' Cup in 1962 and their first trophy of any kind in 14 years.
Copa Libertadores Quarterfinals, first leg:
Cruzeiro  0–2  São Paulo
Flamengo  2–3  Universidad de Chile
AFC Champions League Round of 16:
East Asia:
Kashima Antlers  0–1  Pohang Steelers
Adelaide United  2–3 (a.e.t.)  Jeonbuk Hyundai Motors
West Asia:
Zob Ahan  1–0  Mes Kerman
Al-Hilal  3–0  Bunyodkor
AFC Cup Round of 16:
Sriwijaya  1–4  Thai Port
SHB Đà Nẵng  4–3 (a.e.t.)  Bình Dương
Al-Qadsia  2–1  Churchill Brothers
Al-Kuwait  1–1 (4–5 pen.)  Al-Ittihad

Ice hockey
Men's World Championship in Germany:
Group B in Mannheim: (teams in bold advance to the Qualification Round)
 2–5 
 1–4 
Final standings: Switzerland 9 points, Canada 6, Latvia 3, Italy 0.
Group D in Cologne: (teams in bold advance to the Qualification Round)
 1–3 
 3–2 
Final standings: Finland 6 points, Germany, Denmark 5, United States 2.
Stanley Cup playoffs (all series best-of-7):
Eastern Conference Semifinals:
Game 7: (8) Montreal Canadiens 5, (4) Pittsburgh Penguins 2. Canadiens win series 4–3.
Game 6: (7) Philadelphia Flyers 2, (6) Boston Bruins 1. Series tied 3–3.

Taekwondo
European Championships in Saint Petersburg, Russia:
Men:
−54 kg:  Seyfula Magomedov   Remzi Basakbugday   Moti Lugasi   Sergej Kolb 
−58 kg:  Joel Bonilla Gonzalez   Alan Nogaev   Stipe Jarloni   Marios Tsourdinis 
Women:
−46 kg:  Rukiye Yildirim   Elaia Torrontegui Ronco   Yuliya Volkova   Sumeyye Karaahmet 
−49 kg:  Lucija Zaninovic   Yasmina Aziez   Kristina Kim   Hanna Zajc

May 11, 2010 (Tuesday)

Badminton
Thomas & Uber Cup in Kuala Lumpur, Malaysia:
Thomas Cup: (teams in bold advance to quarter-finals)
Group A:  4–1 
Final standings: China 2 points, Korea 1,  0.
Group B:  2–3 
Final standings: Japan 2 points, Malaysia 1,  0.
Group C:  4–1 
Final standings: Denmark 2 points, Germany 1,  0.
Group D:  4–1 
Final standings:  2 points, India 1, Australia 0.
Uber Cup: (teams in bold advance to quarter-finals)
Group A:  5–0 
Final standings: China 2 points, Malaysia 1,  0.
Group B:  5–0 
Final standings: Indonesia 2 points, Denmark 1,  0.
Group C:  5–0 
Final standings: Japan 2 points, Russia 1,  0.
Group D:  4–1 
Final standings: Korea 2 points, India 1,  0.

Basketball
 NBA Playoffs (best-of-7 series):
Eastern Conference Semifinals:
Game 5: Boston Celtics 120, Cleveland Cavaliers 88. Celtics lead series 3–2.

Chess
World Championship in Sofia, Bulgaria:
Game 12: Viswanathan Anand  (Black) def. Veselin Topalov  (White).
Anand wins series 6½–5½ and retains his title.

Cricket
ICC Men's World Twenty20 in West Indies:
Group F: (teams in bold advance to semi-finals)
 163/5 (20 overs);  167/5 (20 overs) in Gros Islet, St Lucia. Sri Lanka win by 5 wickets.
 105 (19 overs);  109/4 (16.2 overs) in Gros Islet, St Lucia. Australia win by 6 wickets.
Final standings: Australia 6 points, Sri Lanka 4, West Indies 2, India 0.

Football (soccer)
Copa Libertadores Quarterfinals, first leg:
Guadalajara  3–0  Libertad
AFC Champions League Round of 16:
East Asia:
Seongnam Ilhwa Chunma  3–0  Gamba Osaka
Suwon Samsung Bluewings  2–0  Beijing Guoan
West Asia:
Al-Gharafa  1–0  Pakhtakor
Al-Shabab  3–2  Esteghlal
AFC Cup Round of 16:
South China  1–3  Al-Riffa
Al-Rayyan  1–1 (2–4 pen.)  Muangthong United
Al-Karamah  1–0  Nasaf Qarshi
Kazma  1–1 (6–5 pen.)  Shabab Al-Ordon
 Estonian Cup Final in Tallinn:
Flora 0–3 Levadia
Levadia win the Cup for the sixth time.
 Israel State Cup Final in Ramat Gan:
Hapoel Tel Aviv 3–1 Bnei Yehuda
Hapoel Tel Aviv win the Cup for the 13th time.
 Slovak Cup Final in Michalovce:
Slovan Bratislava 6–0 Spartak Trnava
Slovan Bratislava win the Cup for the fourth time.

Ice hockey
Men's World Championship in Germany:
Group A in Cologne: (teams in bold advance to the Qualification Round)
 4–1 
 2–4 
Standings (after 2 matches): Russia 6 points, Slovakia, Belarus 3, Kazakhstan 0.
Group C in Mannheim: (teams in bold advance to the Qualification Round)
 2–3 
 3–2 
Standings (after 2 matches): Sweden 6 points, Norway, Czech Republic 3, France 0.
Stanley Cup playoffs (best-of-7 series):
Western Conference Semifinals:
Game 6: (2) Chicago Blackhawks 5, (3) Vancouver Canucks 1. Blackhawks win series 4–2.

May 10, 2010 (Monday)

Badminton
Thomas & Uber Cup in Kuala Lumpur, Malaysia:
Thomas Cup: (teams in bold advance to quarter-finals, teams in strike are eliminated)
Group A:  5–0 
Standings: , Korea 1 point (1 match), Peru 0 (2).
Group B:  5–0 
Standings: , Japan 1 point (1 match), Nigeria 0 (2).
Group C:  5–0 
Standings: , Germany 1 point (1 match), Poland 0 (2).
Group D:  4–1 
Standings: Indonesia 2 points (2 matches), India,  0 (1).
Uber Cup: (teams in bold advance to quarter-finals, teams in strike are eliminated)
Group A:  5–0 
Standings: , Malaysia 1 point (1 match), United States 0 (2).
Group B:  3–2 
Standings: , Denmark 1 point (1 match), Australia 0 (2).
Group C:  4–1 
Standings: , Russia 1 point (1 match), Germany 0 (2).
Group D:  5–0 
Standings: , India 1 point (1 match), South Africa 0 (2).

Basketball
 NBA Playoffs (all series best-of-7):
Eastern Conference Semifinals:
Game 4: Orlando Magic 98, Atlanta Hawks 84. Magic win series 4–0.
Western Conference Semifinals:
Game 4: Los Angeles Lakers 111, Utah Jazz 96. Lakers win series 4–0.

Cricket
ICC Men's World Twenty20 in West Indies: (teams in bold advance to the semi-finals)
Group E:
 148/7 (20 overs);  137/7 (20 overs) in Gros Islet, St Lucia. Pakistan win by 11 runs.
 149/6 (20 overs);  153/7 (19.1 overs) in Gros Islet, St Lucia. England win by 3 wickets.
Final standings: England 6 points, Pakistan, New Zealand, South Africa 2.
ICC Women's World Twenty20 in West Indies: (teams in bold advance to the semi-finals)
Group B:
 65/9 (20 overs);  71/4 (8.2 overs) in Basseterre, St Kitts. New Zealand win by 6 wickets.
 144/3 (20 overs);  73/9 (20 overs) in Basseterre, St Kitts. India win by 71 runs.
Final standings: New Zealand 6 points, India 4, Sri Lanka 2, Pakistan 0.

Cycling
Grand Tours:
Giro d'Italia:
Stage 3:  Wouter Weylandt  5h 00' 06"  Graeme Brown  s.t.  Robert Förster  s.t.
General classification: (1) Alexander Vinokourov   10h 07' 18" (2) Richie Porte   s.t. (3) David Millar  + 1"

Football (soccer)
 Armenian Cup Final in Yerevan:
Pyunik 0–4 Banants
Banants win the Cup for the third time.

Ice hockey
Men's World Championship in Germany:
Group B in Mannheim: (teams in bold advance to the Qualification Round)
 3–0 
 1–6 
Standings (after 2 matches): Canada, Switzerland 6 points, Latvia, Italy 0.
Group D in Cologne: (teams in bold advance to the Qualification Round)
 1–2 (OT) 
 0–1 
Standings (after 2 matches): Denmark 5 points, Finland 3, Germany, United States 2.
Stanley Cup playoffs (all series best-of-7):
Eastern Conference Semifinals:
Game 6: (8) Montreal Canadiens 4, (4) Pittsburgh Penguins 3. Series tied 3–3.
Game 5: (7) Philadelphia Flyers 4, (6) Boston Bruins 0. Bruins lead series 3–2.

May 9, 2010 (Sunday)

Auto racing
Formula One:
Spanish Grand Prix in Montmeló, Spain:
(1) Mark Webber  (Red Bull–Renault) (2) Fernando Alonso  (Ferrari) (3) Sebastian Vettel  (Red Bull-Renault)
Drivers' championship standings (after 5 of 19 rounds): (1) Jenson Button  (McLaren–Mercedes) 70 points (2) Alonso 67 (3) Vettel 60
Constructors' championship standings: (1) McLaren 119 points (2) Ferrari 116 (3) Red Bull 113
World Rally Championship:
Rally New Zealand in Auckland, New Zealand:
(1) Jari-Matti Latvala  / Miikka Anttila  (Ford Focus RS WRC 09) (2) Sébastien Ogier  / Julien Ingrassia  (Citroën C4 WRC) (3) Sébastien Loeb  / Daniel Elena  (Citroën C4 WRC)
Drivers' championship standings (after 5 of 13 rounds): (1) Loeb 108 points (2) Latvala 72 (3) Mikko Hirvonen  (Ford Focus RS WRC 09) 64

Badminton
Thomas & Uber Cup in Kuala Lumpur, Malaysia:
Thomas Cup:
Group A:  5–0 
Group B:  5–0 
Group C:  5–0 
Group D:  5–0 
Uber Cup:
Group A:  5–0 
Group B:  5–0 
Group C:  4–1 
Group D:  5–0

Baseball
 Dallas Braden throws the 19th perfect game in Major League Baseball history in the Oakland Athletics' 4–0 win over the Tampa Bay Rays.

Basketball
Euroleague Final Four in Paris, France:
Third-place playoff:  CSKA Moscow  90–88  Partizan Belgrade
Final:  Regal FC Barcelona  86–68   Olympiacos Piraeus
Barcelona win the title for the second time.
Juan Carlos Navarro is named the Final Four MVP.
 NBA Playoffs (all series best-of-7):
Eastern Conference Semifinals:
Game 4: Boston Celtics 97, Cleveland Cavaliers 87. Series tied 2–2.
Western Conference Semifinals:
Game 4: Phoenix Suns 107, San Antonio Spurs 101. Suns win series 4–0.

Chess
World Championship in Sofia, Bulgaria:
Game 11: Viswanathan Anand  (White) drew with Veselin Topalov  (Black)
Series tied 5½–5½.

Cricket
ICC Men's World Twenty20 in West Indies:
Group F:
 169/6 (20 overs);  155/9 (20 overs) in Bridgetown, Barbados. West Indies win by 14 runs.
 168/5 (20 overs);  87 (16.2 overs) in Bridgetown, Barbados. Australia win by 81 runs.
Standings (after 2 matches): Australia 4 points, Sri Lanka, West Indies 2, India 0.
ICC Women's World Twenty20 in West Indies: (teams in bold advance to the semi-finals)
Group A: (teams in bold advance to the semi-finals)
 141/6 (20 overs);  85 (17 overs) in Basseterre, St Kitts. England win by 56 runs.
 133/7 (20 overs);  124/7 (20 overs) in Basseterre, St Kitts. Australia win by 9 runs.
Final standings: Australia 6 points, West Indies 4, England 2, South Africa 0.

Cycling
Grand Tours:
Giro d'Italia:
Stage 2:  Tyler Farrar  4h 56' 46"  Matthew Goss  s.t.  Fabio Sabatini  s.t.
General classification: (1) Cadel Evans   5h 07' 09" (2) Farrar  + 1" (3) Alexander Vinokourov  + 3"

Football (soccer)
2011 FIFA Women's World Cup qualification (UEFA):
Group 1:  1–2 
Standings:  18 points (6 matches),  15 (6), Serbia 7 (6),  3 (4), Croatia 1 (6)
CAF Champions League Qualification Second round, second leg: (first leg score in parentheses)
Heartland  3–1 (1–1)  Supersport United. Heartland win 4–2 on aggregate.
TP Mazembe  3–0 (1–0)  Djoliba. TP Mazembe win 4–0 on aggregate.
Atlético Petróleos Luanda  2–1 (0–2)  JS Kabylie. JS Kabylie win 3–2 on aggregate.
Ismaily  3–1 (1–0)  Al-Hilal Omdurman. Ismaily win 4–1 on aggregate.
Al-Ahly  3–0 (0–2)  Ittihad. Al-Ahly win 3–2 on aggregate.
CAF Confederation Cup Second round, second leg: (first leg score in parentheses)
CAPS United  2–0 (1–2)  Warri Wolves. CAPS United win 3–2 on aggregate.
Enyimba  3–0 (0–3)  AS Vita Club. 3–3 on aggregate; Enyimba win 5–4 on penalties.
 Premier League, final matchday: (teams in bold qualify for the Champions League, teams in italics qualify for Europa League, ranking prior to the matches in parentheses)
(1) Chelsea 8–0 (15) Wigan Athletic
(2) Manchester United 4–0 (10) Stoke
(3) Arsenal 4–0 (12) Fulham
(18) Burnley 4–2 (4) Tottenham Hotspur
Final standings: Chelsea 86 points, Manchester United 85, Arsenal 75, Tottenham Hotspur 70, Manchester City 67, Aston Villa 64, Liverpool 63.
Chelsea win the championship for the fourth time.
 Primeira Liga, final matchday: (teams in bold qualify for the Champions League, teams in italics qualify for Europa League, ranking prior to the matches in parentheses)
(1) Benfica 2–1 (11) Rio Ave
(6) Nacional 1–1 (2) Braga
(5) Vitória de Guimarães 1–2 (7) Marítimo
Final standings: Benfica 76 points, Sporting de Braga 71, Porto 68, Sporting CP 48, Marítimo, Vitória de Guimarães 41, Nacional 39.
Benfica win the championship for the 32nd time.
 Scottish Premier League, final matchday: (teams in bold qualify for the Champions League, teams in italics qualify for Europa League, ranking prior to the matches in parentheses)
(1) Rangers 3–3 (4) Motherwell
(6) Heart of Midlothian 1–2 (2) Celtic
(3) Dundee United 0–2 (5) Hibernian
Final standings: Rangers 87 points, Celtic 81, Dundee United 63, Hibernian 54, Motherwell 53, Heart of Midlothian 48.
Rangers win their 53rd championship.
Motherwell will enter Europa League if Dundee United win the Scottish Cup Final.
 Albanian Cup Final in Tirana:
Besa Kavajë 2–1 (aet) Vllaznia Shkodër
Besa Kavajë win the Cup for the second time.
 Swiss Cup Final in Basel:
FC Basel 6–0 FC Lausanne-Sport
FC Basel win the Cup for the tenth time.

Golf
PGA Tour:
The Players Championship in Ponte Vedra Beach, Florida:
Winner: Tim Clark  272 (−16)
Clark wins his first PGA Tour title.
European Tour:
BMW Italian Open in Turin, Italy:
Winner: Fredrik Andersson Hed  268 (−16)
Andersson Hed wins his first European Tour title at the 245th attempt.

Ice hockey
Men's World Championship in Germany:
Group A in Cologne:
 5–2 
 1–3 
Group C in Mannheim:
 6–2 
 2–5 
Stanley Cup playoffs (best-of-7 series):
Western Conference Semifinals:
Game 5: (3) Vancouver Canucks 4, (2) Chicago Blackhawks 1. Blackhawks lead series 3–2.

Motorcycle racing
Superbike:
Monza Superbike World Championship round in Monza, Italy:
Race 1: (1) Max Biaggi  (Aprilia RSV 4) (2) James Toseland  (Yamaha YZF-R1) (3) Cal Crutchlow  (Yamaha YZF-R1)
Race 2: (1) Biaggi (2) Leon Haslam  (Suzuki GSX-R1000) (3) Troy Corser  (BMW S1000RR)
Riders' championship standings (after 5 of 13 rounds): (1) Haslam 181 points (2) Biaggi 178 (3) Jonathan Rea  (Honda CBR1000RR) & Carlos Checa  (Ducati 1098R) 110
Manufacturers' championship standings: (1) Aprilia 184 points (2) Suzuki 181 (3) Ducati 149
Supersport:
Monza Supersport World Championship round in Monza, Italy:
(1) Eugene Laverty  (Honda CBR600RR) (2) Kenan Sofuoğlu  (Honda CBR600RR) (3) Joan Lascorz  (Kawasaki Ninja ZX-6R)
Riders' championship standings (after 5 of 13 rounds): (1) Lascorz 101 points (2) Sofuoğlu 97 (3) Laverty 91
Manufacturers' championship standings: (1) Honda 120 points (2) Kawasaki 101 (3) Triumph 65

Tennis
ATP World Tour:
BMW Open in Munich, Germany:
Final: Mikhail Youzhny  def. Marin Čilić  6–3, 4–6, 6–4
Youzhny wins the sixth title of his career.
Serbia Open in Belgrade, Serbia:
Final: Sam Querrey  def. John Isner  3–6, 7–6(4), 6–4
Querrey wins his second title of the year and the fourth title of his career.
Estoril Open in Estoril, Portugal:
Final: Albert Montañés  def. Frederico Gil  6–2, 6–7(4), 7–5
Montañés wins the fourth title of his career and the second successive title of this event.

May 8, 2010 (Saturday)

Auto racing
NASCAR Sprint Cup Series:
Southern 500 in Darlington, South Carolina:
(1)  Denny Hamlin (Toyota, Joe Gibbs Racing) (2)  Jamie McMurray (Chevrolet, Earnhardt Ganassi Racing) (3)  Kurt Busch (Dodge, Penske Racing)
Drivers' championship standings (after 11 of 36 races): (1)  Kevin Harvick (Chevrolet, Richard Childress Racing 1622 points (2)  Jimmie Johnson (Chevrolet, Hendrick Motorsports) 1512 (3)  Kyle Busch (Toyota, Joe Gibbs Racing) 1509

Basketball
 NBA Playoffs (all series best-of-7):
Eastern Conference Semifinals:
Game 3: Orlando Magic 105, Atlanta Hawks 75. Magic lead series 3–0.
Western Conference Semifinals:
Game 3: Los Angeles Lakers 111, Utah Jazz 110. Lakers lead series 3–0.

Cricket
ICC Men's World Twenty20 in West Indies:
Group E:
 133/7 (20 overs);  132/7 (20 overs) in Bridgetown, Barbados. New Zealand win by 1 run.
 168/7 (20 overs);  129 (19 overs) in Bridgetown, Barbados. England win by 39 runs.
Standings (after 2 matches): England 4 points, New Zealand, South Africa 2, Pakistan 0.
ICC Women's World Twenty20 in West Indies: (teams in bold advance to the semifinals)
Group B:
 104/6 (20 overs);  106/1 (16.4 overs) in Basseterre, St Kitts. India win by 9 wickets.
 154/7 (20 overs);  107/8 (20 overs) in Basseterre, St Kitts. New Zealand win by 47 runs.
Standings (after 2 matches): New Zealand 4 points, India, Sri Lanka 2, Pakistan 0.

Cycling
Grand Tours:
Giro d'Italia:
Stage 1:  Bradley Wiggins  10' 18"  Brent Bookwalter  + 2"  Cadel Evans  + 2"

Equestrianism
Show jumping:
Global Champions Tour:
1st Competition in Valencia:  Timothée Anciaume  on Lamm de Fetan  Marcus Ehning  on Sabrina  Jos Lansink  on Valentina van't Heike

Football (soccer)
CAF Champions League Qualification Second round, second leg: (first leg score in parentheses)
Zanaco  2–2 (0–1)  ES Sétif. ES Sétif win 3–2 on aggregate.
Gaborone United  0–0 (1–4)  Dynamos. Dynamos win 4–1 on aggregate.
Al-Merreikh  1–1 (0–3)  Espérance ST. Espérance ST win 4–1 on aggregate.
CAF Confederation Cup Second round, second leg: (first leg score in parentheses)
DC Motema Pembe  0–0 (0–1)  ASFAN. ASFAN win 1–0 on aggregate.
Primeiro de Agosto  0–0 (2–1)  Cotonsport. Primeiro de Agosto win 2–1 on aggregate.
Haras El Hodood  5–1 (1–2)  Simba S.C. Haras El Hodood win 6–3 on aggregate.
CS Sfaxien  1–0 (1–1)  Petrojet. CS Sfaxien win 2–1 on aggregate.
Stade Malien  0–0 (0–2)  FUS Rabat. FUS Rabat win 2–0 on aggregate.
 Belgian First Division, final matchday: (teams in bold qualify for the Champions League, teams in italics qualify for Europa League, ranking prior to the matches in parentheses)
(1) Anderlecht 2–1 (4) Sint-Truiden
(3) Gent 6–2 (2) Club Brugge
(6) Zulte Waregem 1–2 (5) Kortrijk
Standings: Anderlecht 59 points, Gent, Club Brugge 41, Sint-Truiden 34, Kortrijk 33, Zulte-Waregem 28.
Anderlecht win the championship for the 30th time.
 Fußball-Bundesliga, final matchday: (teams in bold qualify for the Champions League, teams in italics qualify for Europa League, ranking prior to the matches in parentheses)
(18) Hertha BSC 1–3 (1) Bayern Munich
(10) Mainz 05 0–0 (2) Schalke 04
(3) Werder Bremen 1–1 (7) Hamburger SV
(13) Borussia Mönchengladbach 1–1 (4) Bayer Leverkusen
(14) SC Freiburg 3–1 (5) Borussia Dortmund
(11) 1899 Hoffenheim 1–1 (6) VfB Stuttgart
Final standings: Bayern Munich 70 points, Schalke 65, Werder Bremen 61, Leverkusen 59, Dortmund 57, Stuttgart 55.
Bayern Munich win the championship for the 22nd time.
 Slovak Superliga, matchday 32 of 33: (teams in bold qualify for the Champions League, teams in italics qualify for Europa League, ranking prior to the matches in parentheses)
(1) Žilina 4–0 (9) DAC Dunajská Streda
(2) Slovan Bratislava 2–0 (3) Dukla Banská Bystrica
Standings: MŠK Žilina 72 points, Slovan Bratislava 67, Dukla Banská Bystrica 55.
MŠK Žilina win the championship for the fifth time.
 Irish Cup Final in Belfast:
Linfield 2–1 Portadown
Linfield win the Cup for the 40th time.
 Slovenian Cup Final in Maribor:
Domžale 2–3 (AET) Maribor
Maribor win the Cup for the sixth time.

Handball
EHF Women's Champions League Final, first leg:
Viborg HK  28–21  CS Oltchim Râmnicu Vâlcea

Ice hockey
Men's World Championship in Germany:
Group B in Mannheim:
 5–1 
 3–1 
Group D in Cologne:  1–4 
Stanley Cup playoffs (all series best-of-7):
Eastern Conference Semifinals:
Game 5: (4) Pittsburgh Penguins 2, (8) Montreal Canadiens 1. Penguins lead series 3–2.
Western Conference Semifinals:
Game 5: (1) San Jose Sharks 2, (5) Detroit Red Wings 1. Sharks win series 4–1.

Mixed martial arts
UFC 113 in Montreal:
Middleweight bout: Alan Belcher  def. Patrick Côté  via submission (rear naked choke)
Heavyweight bout: Matt Mitrione  def. Kimbo Slice  via TKO (punches)
Lightweight bout: Jeremy Stephens  def. Sam Stout  via split decision (30–27, 29–28, 28–29)
Welterweight bout: Josh Koscheck  def. Paul Daley  via unanimous decision (30–27, 30–27, 30–27)
Light Heavyweight Championship bout: Mauricio Rua  def. Lyoto Machida  (c) via KO (punches)

Rugby union
2011 Rugby World Cup qualifying:
Asian Five Nations: (teams in strike are eliminated)
 60–5  Arabian Gulf in Tokyo
 19–15 
Standings: Japan 12 points (2 matches), Hong Kong 12 (3), Kazakhstan 7 (2), Arabian Gulf 5 (3),  0 (2)
European Nations Cup Champions Playoff Series:
Round 4:  16–27  in Šiauliai
 Lithuania lose a Test for the first time in four years, ending their record streak of Test wins at 18.
 Top 14 playoffs, quarterfinal:
Toulouse 35–12 Castres

Tennis
WTA Tour:
Internazionali BNL d'Italia in Rome, Italy:
Final: María José Martínez Sánchez  def. Jelena Janković  7–6(5), 7–5
Martínez Sánchez wins her third career title, and becomes the first Spanish winner of a top-tier WTA Tour title since Conchita Martínez at Berlin in 2000.
Estoril Open in Estoril, Portugal:
Final: Anastasija Sevastova  def. Arantxa Parra Santonja  6–2, 7–5
Sevastova wins her first career title, and becomes the first Latvian winner of a WTA Tour title since Larisa Neiland in 1993.

Triathlon
ITU World Championships in Seoul, South Korea:
Men:  Jan Frodeno   Courtney Atkinson   Brad Kahlefeldt 
Standings (after 2 of 7 events): (1) Alexander Brukhankov  1326 points (2) Bevan Docherty  1301 (3) Dmitry Polyanski  1175
Women:  Daniela Ryf   Barbara Riveros Diaz   Emma Moffatt 
Standings (after 2 of 7 events): (1) Riveros Diaz 1540 points (2) Moffatt 1370 (3) Andrea Hewitt  1326

May 7, 2010 (Friday)

Auto racing
Nationwide Series:
Diamond Hill Plywood 200 in Darlington, South Carolina
(1)  Denny Hamlin (Toyota, Joe Gibbs Racing) (2)  Kyle Busch (Toyota, Joe Gibbs Racing) (3)  Jamie McMurray (Chevrolet, JR Motorsports)
Drivers' championship standings (after 10 of 35 races): (1)  Brad Keselowski (Dodge, Penske Racing) 1615 points (2) Busch 1560 (3)  Kevin Harvick (Chevrolet, Kevin Harvick Incorporated) 1552

Baseball
Major League Baseball:
In the Chicago Cubs' 14–7 win over the Cincinnati Reds, the Cubs' Starlin Castro becomes the first player ever to drive in 6 runs in his MLB debut.
The game between the Baltimore Orioles and the Minnesota Twins was postponed due to rain, the first rainout in the history of Target Field and the first postponement of an outdoor MLB game in Minnesota since September 20, .
Jamie Moyer becomes the oldest pitcher in MLB history to pitch a complete-game shutout as the Philadelphia Phillies beat the Atlanta Braves, 7–0. Moyer did the feat at the age of 47 years, 170 days, respectively surpassing Phil Niekro (46 years, 188 days) and Satchel Paige (46 years, 75 days) as the oldest pitcher and oldest non-knuckleballer to accomplish this feat. (Major League Baseball via Philadelphia Phillies)

Basketball
Euroleague Final Four in Paris, France:
Semifinals:
Regal FC Barcelona  64–54  CSKA Moscow
Partizan Belgrade  80–83 (OT)  Olympiacos Piraeus
Barcelona and Olympiacos will play a re-match of 1997 final.
 NBA Playoffs (all series best-of-7):
Eastern Conference Semifinals:
Game 3: Cleveland Cavaliers 124, Boston Celtics 95. Cavaliers lead series 2–1.
Western Conference Semifinals:
Game 3: Phoenix Suns 110, San Antonio Spurs 96. Suns lead series 3–0.

Chess
World Championship in Sofia, Bulgaria:
Game 10: Veselin Topalov  (White) drew with Viswanathan Anand  (Black).
Series tied 5–5.

Cricket
ICC Men's World Twenty20 in West Indies:
Group F:
 184/5 (20 overs);  135 (17.4 overs) in Bridgetown, Barbados. Australia win by 49 runs.
 195/3 (20 overs);  138/8 (20 overs) in Bridgetown, Barbados. Sri Lanka win by 57 runs.
ICC Women's World Twenty20 in West Indies: (teams in bold advance to the semi-finals)
Group A:
 155 (19.3 overs);  131/7 (20 overs) in Basseterre, St Kitts. Australia win by 24 runs.
 122/8 (20 overs);  120/9 (20 overs) in Basseterre, St Kitts. West Indies win by 2 runs.
Standings (after 2 matches): Australia, West Indies 4 points, England, South Africa 0.

Football (soccer)
CAF Confederation Cup Second round, second leg: (first leg score in parentheses)
CR Belouizdad  2–0 (0–1)  Amal Atbara. Belouizdad win 2–1 on aggregate.

Ice hockey
Men's World Championship in Germany:
Group D in Gelsenkirchen:  1–2 (OT) 
In the highest-attended ice hockey game ever, Felix Schütz scores the winning goal 21 seconds into overtime.
Stanley Cup playoffs (all series best-of-7):
Eastern Conference Semifinals:
Game 4: (7) Philadelphia Flyers 5, (6) Boston Bruins 4 (OT). Bruins lead series 3–1.
Western Conference Semifinals:
Game 4: (2) Chicago Blackhawks 7, (3) Vancouver Canucks 4. Blackhawks lead series 3–1.

Rugby union
 Top 14 playoffs quarter-final:
Clermont 21–17 Racing Métro

May 6, 2010 (Thursday)

Basketball
 NBA Playoffs (best-of-7 series):
Eastern Conference Semifinals:
Game 2: Orlando Magic 112, Atlanta Hawks 98. Magic lead series 2–0.
NBA season awards:
All-NBA Teams:
First Team:
F Kevin Durant, Oklahoma City Thunder (1st selection to an All-NBA team)
F LeBron James, Cleveland Cavaliers (6th selection)
C Dwight Howard, Orlando Magic (4th selection)
G Kobe Bryant, Los Angeles Lakers (12th selection)
G Dwyane Wade, Miami Heat (5th selection)
Second Team:
F Carmelo Anthony, Denver Nuggets (4th selection)
F Dirk Nowitzki, Dallas Mavericks (10th selection)
C Amar'e Stoudemire, Phoenix Suns (4th selection)
G Deron Williams, Utah Jazz (2nd selection)
G Steve Nash, Phoenix Suns (7th selection)
Third Team:
F Pau Gasol, Los Angeles Lakers (2nd selection)
F Tim Duncan, San Antonio Spurs (13th selection)
C Andrew Bogut, Milwaukee Bucks (1st selection)
G Joe Johnson, Atlanta Hawks (1st selection)
G Brandon Roy, Portland Trail Blazers (2nd selection)

Chess
World Championship in Sofia, Bulgaria:
Game 9: Viswanathan Anand  (White) drew with Veselin Topalov  (Black)
Series tied 4½–4½.

Cricket
ICC Men's World Twenty20 in West Indies:
Group E:
 147/9 (20 overs);  148/4 (19.3 overs) in Bridgetown, Barbados. England win by 6 wickets.
 170/4 (20 overs);  157/7 (20 overs) in Bridgetown, Barbados. South Africa win by 13 runs.
ICC Women's World Twenty20 in West Indies:
Group B:
 108 (19.3 overs);  107 (20 overs) in Basseterre, St Kitts. Sri Lanka win by 1 run.
 139/8 (20 overs);  129/8 (20 overs) in Basseterre, St Kitts. New Zealand win by 10 runs.

Darts
Premier League round 13 in Newcastle, England: (players in bold advance to semi-final, players in strike are eliminated)
Adrian Lewis  7–7 Ronnie Baxter 
Mervyn King  5–8 Raymond van Barneveld 
James Wade  4–8 Simon Whitlock 
Terry Jenkins  5–8 Phil Taylor 
High checkout: King 130
Standings after 13 rounds: Taylor 24 points, Whitlock 14, King, Baxter 13, Wade 12, Lewis 11, Barneveld 9, Jenkins 8.

Football (soccer)
Copa Libertadores Round of 16, second leg: (first leg score in parentheses)
Internacional  2–0 (1–3)  Banfield. 3–3 on aggregate; Internacional win on away goals.
Libertad  2–1 (0–0)  Once Caldas. Libertad win 2–1 on aggregate.
Universidad de Chile  2–2 (1–0)  Alianza Lima. Universidad de Chile win 3–2 on aggregate.
 KNVB Cup Final, second leg: (first leg score in parentheses)
Feyenoord 1–4 (0–2) Ajax. Ajax win 6–1 on aggregate.
Ajax win the Cup for the 18th time.

Ice hockey
Stanley Cup playoffs (all series best-of-7):
Eastern Conference Semifinals:
Game 4: (8) Montreal Canadiens 3, (4) Pittsburgh Penguins 2. Series tied 2–2.
Western Conference Semifinals:
Game 4: (5) Detroit Red Wings 7, (1) San Jose Sharks 1. Sharks lead series 3–1.

May 5, 2010 (Wednesday)

Basketball
 NBA Playoffs (best-of-7 series):
Western Conference Semifinals:
Game 2: Phoenix Suns 110, San Antonio Spurs 102. Suns lead series 2–0.

Cricket
ICC Men's World Twenty20 in West Indies: (teams in bold advance to the Super 8s)
Group A:  141/7 (20 overs);  114 (18.4 overs) in Bridgetown, Barbados. Australia win by 27 runs.
Final standings: Australia 4 points,  2, Bangladesh 0.
Group C:  139/7 (20 overs);  80 (16 overs) in Bridgetown, Barbados. South Africa win by 59 runs.
Final standings:  4 points, South Africa 2, Afghanistan 0.
ICC Women's World Twenty20 in West Indies:
Group A:
 175/5 (20 overs; Deandra Dottin 112*);  158/4 (20 overs) in Basseterre, St Kitts. West Indies win by 17 runs.
Dottin becomes the first player to hit a century in a women's Twenty20 International.
 104 (17.3 overs);  104 (19.4 overs) in Basseterre, St Kitts. Match tied. Australia win the one-over eliminator.

Football (soccer)
Copa Libertadores Round of 16, second leg: (first leg score in parentheses)
Estudiantes  3–1 (1–0)  San Luis. Estudiantes win 4–1 on aggregate.
Corinthians  2–1 (0–1)  Flamengo. 2–2 on aggregate; Flamengo win on away goals.
Nacional  0–3 (1–3)  Cruzeiro. Cruzeiro win 6–1 on aggregate.
 Danish Superliga, matchday 31 of 33:
F.C. Copenhagen 3–0 HB Køge
Standings: F.C. Copenhagen 65 points, OB 53 (30 matches).
F.C. Copenhagen win the championship for the second straight time and eighth overall.
 Ligue 1, matchday 36 of 38:
Marseille 3–1 Rennes
Lyon 2–1 Auxerre
Toulouse 0–2 Lille
Standings: Marseille 75 points, Lille, Auxerre 67, Lyon 65 (35 matches), Montpellier 63.
Marseille win the championship for the ninth time and the first since 1992.
 Ukrainian Premier League, matchday 29 of 30:
Shakhtar Donetsk 1–0 Dinamo Kyiv
Standings (teams in bold qualify for the Champions League, teams in italics qualify for Europa League): Shakhtar Donetsk 74 points, Dinamo Kyiv 68, Metalist Kharkiv 59, Dnipro Dnipropetrovsk 53, Karpaty Lviv 49.
Shakhtar Donetsk win their fifth championship.
 Kup Bosne i Hercegovine Final, first leg:
Borac 1–1 Željezničar
 Bulgarian Cup Final in Lovech:
Chernomorets Pomorie 0–1 Beroe
Beroe win the Cup for the first time.
 Croatian Cup Final, second leg: (first leg score in parentheses)
Šibenik 0–2 (1–2) Hajduk Split. Hajduk Split win 4–1 on aggregate.
Hajduk Split win the Cup for the fifth time.
 Coppa Italia Final in Rome:
Internazionale 1–0 Roma
Internazionale win the Cup for the sixth time, and complete the first leg of a possible treble.
 Serbian Cup Final in Belgrade:
Red Star 3–0 Vojvodina
Red Star win the national Cup (including former Yugoslavia and Serbia/Montenegro) for the 23rd time.
 Turkish Cup Final in Şanlıurfa:
Fenerbahçe 1–3 Trabzonspor
Trabzonspor win the Cup for the eighth time.

Ice hockey
Stanley Cup playoffs (all series best-of-7):
Eastern Conference Semifinals:
Game 3: (6) Boston Bruins 4, (7) Philadelphia Flyers 1. Bruins lead series 3–0.
Western Conference Semifinals:
Game 3: (2) Chicago Blackhawks 5, (3) Vancouver Canucks 2. Blackhawks lead series 2–1.

May 4, 2010 (Tuesday)

Basketball
 NBA Playoffs (all series best-of-7):
Eastern Conference Semifinals:
Game 1: Orlando Magic 114, Atlanta Hawks 71. Magic lead series 1–0.
Western Conference Semifinals:
Game 2: Los Angeles Lakers 111, Utah Jazz 103. Lakers lead series 2–0.

Chess
World Championship in Sofia, Bulgaria:
Game 8: Veselin Topalov  (White) def. Viswanathan Anand  (Black)
Series tied 4–4.

Cricket
ICC Men's World Twenty20 in West Indies: (teams in bold advance to the Super 8s)
Group B:  84 (15.1 overs);  36/1 (8.1 overs) in Guyana. New Zealand win by 7 runs (D/L).
Final standings: New Zealand 4 points,  2, Zimbabwe 0.
Group D:  120/8 (20 overs);  14/1 (3.3 overs) in Guyana. Match abandoned; no result.
Final standings:  4 points, England, Ireland 1.

Football (soccer)
Copa Libertadores Round of 16, second leg: (first leg score in parentheses)
São Paulo  0–0 (0–0)  Universitario. 0–0 on aggregate; São Paulo win 3–1 on penalties.
Vélez Sársfield  2–0 (0–3)  Guadalajara. Guadalajara win 3–2 on aggregate.

Ice hockey
Stanley Cup playoffs (all series best-of-7):
Eastern Conference Semifinals:
Game 3: (4) Pittsburgh Penguins 2, (8) Montreal Canadiens 0. Penguins lead series 2–1.
Western Conference Semifinals:
Game 3: (1) San Jose Sharks 4, (5) Detroit Red Wings 3 (OT). Sharks lead series 3–0.

May 3, 2010 (Monday)

Basketball
 NBA Playoffs (all series best-of-7):
Eastern Conference Semifinals:
Game 2: Boston Celtics 104, Cleveland Cavaliers 86. Series tied 1–1.
Western Conference Semifinals:
Game 1: Phoenix Suns 111, San Antonio Spurs 102. Suns lead series 1–0.
In other NBA news, Chicago Bulls head coach Vinny Del Negro is dismissed, after the team's first-round playoff exit to the Cleveland Cavaliers. (NBA via Associated Press)

Chess
World Championship in Sofia, Bulgaria:
Game 7: Viswanathan Anand  (White) drew with Veselin Topalov  (Black)
Anand leads the series 4–3.

Cricket
ICC Men's World Twenty20 in West Indies: (teams in bold advance to the Super 8s)
Group B:  173/7 (20 overs; Mahela Jayawardene 100);  29/1 (5/5 overs) in Guyana. Sri Lanka win by 14 runs (D/L).
Standings: Sri Lanka 2 points (2 matches),  2 (1), Zimbabwe 0 (1).
Group D:  191/5 (20 overs);  60/2 (5.5/6 overs) in Guyana. West Indies win by 8 wickets (D/L).
Standings: West Indies 4 points (2 matches), England,  0 (1).

Equestrianism
Eventing:
Badminton Horse Trials at Badminton House, Gloucestershire, United Kingdom:  Paul Tapner  on Inonothing 44.9 points  Andreas Dibowski  on Euroridings Butts Leon 49.5  Daisy Berkeley  on Spring Along 50.4

Football (soccer)
 FA Women's Cup Final in Nottingham:
Arsenal 2–3 (AET) Everton
Everton win the Cup for the second time, having previously won in 1989 as Leasowe Pacific.

Ice hockey
Stanley Cup playoffs (all series best-of-7):
Eastern Conference Semifinals:
Game 2: (6) Boston Bruins 3, (7) Philadelphia Flyers 2. Bruins lead series 2–0.
Western Conference Semifinals:
Game 2: (2) Chicago Blackhawks 4, (3) Vancouver Canucks 2. Series tied 1–1.

Snooker
World Championship in Sheffield, England:
Final (best of 35 frames):
Neil Robertson  def. Graeme Dott  18–13
Robertson wins his fifth ranking title, becoming the third player from outside the United Kingdom to win the World Championship in the modern era.

May 2, 2010 (Sunday)

Auto racing
World Touring Car Championship:
Race of Morocco:
Round 3: (1) Gabriele Tarquini  (SR-Sport; SEAT León) (2) Rob Huff  (Chevrolet; Chevrolet Cruze) (3) Tiago Monteiro  (SR-Sport; SEAT León)
Round 4: (1) Andy Priaulx  (BMW Team RBM; BMW 320si) (2) Yvan Muller  (Chevrolet; Chevrolet Cruze) (3) Tom Coronel  (SR-Sport; SEAT León)
Drivers' championship standings (after 4 of 22 rounds): (1) Tarquini 70 points (2) Muller 63 (3) Huff 46
Manufacturers' championship standings: (1) SEAT Customers Technology 133 points (2) Chevrolet 118 (3) BMW 93
V8 Supercars:
City of Ipswich 300 in Queensland Raceway, Ipswich, Queensland:
Race 10: (1) James Courtney  (Ford Falcon) (2) Garth Tander  (Holden Commodore) (3) Shane van Gisbergen  (Ford Falcon)
Drivers' championship standings (after 10 of 26 races): (1) Jamie Whincup  (Holden Commodore) 1191 points (2) Courtney 1167 (3) Van Gisbergen 984

Basketball
 NBA Playoffs (all series best-of-7):
Eastern Conference First Round:
Game 7: Atlanta Hawks 95, Milwaukee Bucks 74. Hawks win series 4–3.
Western Conference Semifinals:
Game 1: Los Angeles Lakers 104, Utah Jazz 99. Lakers lead series 1–0.
NBA season awards:
Most Valuable Player: LeBron James, Cleveland Cavaliers
EuroChallenge Final Four:
Third-place playoff:  Chorale Roanne Basket  86–80  Scavolini Spar Pesaro
Final:  BG Göttingen  83–75   Krasnye Krylya Samara
BG Göttingen win their first European title.

Cricket
ICC Men's World Twenty20 in West Indies: (teams in bold advance to the Super 8s)
Group C:  186/5 (20 overs, Suresh Raina 101);  172/5 (20 overs) in Gros Islet, St Lucia. India win by 14 runs.
Standings: India 4 points (2 matches), South Africa,  0 (1).
Group A:  191 (20 overs);  157 (20 overs) in Gros Islet, St Lucia. Australia win by 34 runs.
Standings: Australia 2 points (1 match), Pakistan 2 (2),  0 (1).

Cycling
UCI ProTour:
Tour de Romandie:
Stage 5:  Alejandro Valverde  3h 36' 19"  Igor Antón  s.t.  Simon Špilak   s.t.
Final general classification: (1) Valverde  17h 37' 55" (2) Špilak  + 11" (3) Denis Menchov  + 21"

Football (soccer)
OFC Champions League Final, second leg: (first leg score in parentheses)
Waitakere United  2–1 (0–3)  PRK Hekari United. PRK Hekari United win 4–2 on aggregate.
PRK Hekari United become the first team from a country other than Australia or New Zealand to win the trophy, and qualify for the FIFA Club World Cup.
 Eredivisie, final matchday:
(9) NAC Breda 0–2 (1) Twente
(12) N.E.C. 1–4 (2) Ajax
Final standings (teams in bold qualify for the Champions League, teams in italics qualify for Europa League): FC Twente 86 points, Ajax 85, PSV 78, Feyenoord 63, AZ 62.
Twente win the championship for the first time since their formation in a 1965 merger, with the only other title by one of their predecessor clubs having come in 1926.
This also marks the first time since 1958 and 1959 that two consecutive Eredivisie titles have been won by teams outside the historic "Big Three" of Ajax, Feyenoord and PSV.
 Brazilian state championships finals, second leg: (first leg score in parentheses)
 São Paulo: Santos 2–3 (3–2) Santo André. 5–5 on aggregate; Santos win the title, due to a superior record in the previous phase.
Santos win the title for the 18th time.
 Rio Grande do Sul: Grêmio 0–1 (2–0) Internacional. Grêmio win 2–1 on aggregate.
Grêmio win the title for the 36th time.
 Ceará: Ceará 2–1 (0–1) Fortaleza. 2–2 on aggregate; Fortaleza win 3–1 on penalties.
Fortaleza win the title for the fourth straight time and 39th overall.
 Bahia: Vitória 1–2 (1–0) Bahia. 2–2 on aggregate; Vitória win the title, due to a superior record in the previous phase.
Vitória win the title for the third straight time and 25th overall.
 Minas Gerais: Atlético Mineiro 2–0 (3–2) Ipatinga. Atlético Mineiro win 5–2 on aggregate.
Atlético Mineiro win the title for the 40th time.
 Santa Catarina: Avaí 2–0 (3–1) Joinville. Avaí win 5–1 on aggregate.
Avaí win the title for the 15th time.
 Goiás: Santa Helena EC 1–3 (0–4) Atlético Goianiense. Atlético Goianiense win 7–1 on aggregate.
Atlético Goianiense win the title for the 11th time.

Golf
PGA Tour:
Quail Hollow Championship in Charlotte, North Carolina:
Winner: Rory McIlroy  273 (−15)
McIlroy wins his first PGA Tour title, shooting a final round 62, a course record.
European Tour:
Open de España in Girona, Spain:
Winner: Álvaro Quirós  277 (−11)PO
Quirós wins his fourth European Tour title.
LPGA Tour:
Tres Marias Championship in Morelia, Mexico:
Winner: Ai Miyazato  273 (−19)
Miyazato wins her third tournament from five starts this season, and her fourth LPGA Tour title in total.
In her last tournament before retirement, world number one Lorena Ochoa finishes in sixth position, seven strokes behind Miyazato.
Champions Tour:
Mississippi Gulf Resort Classic in Biloxi, Mississippi:
Winner: David Eger  205 (−11)
Eger wins his third Champions Tour title.
Japan Tour:
The Crowns in Nagoya, Japan
Winner: Ryo Ishikawa  267 (−13)
Ishikawa wins his seventh Japan Tour title. In doing so, he becomes the first golfer ever to shoot an 18-hole round of 58 on a major professional tour.

Gymnastics
European Women's Artistic Gymnastics Championships in Birmingham, United Kingdom:
Seniors:
Vault:  Yekaterina Kurbatova   Youna Dufournet   Tatiana Nabieva 
Uneven bars:  Elizabeth Tweddle   Aliya Mustafina   Nataliya Kononenko 
Balance beam:  Elena Amelia Racea   Mustafina  Raluca Oana Haidu 
Floor:  Tweddle  Anna Myzdrikova   Diana Chelaru 
Juniors:
Vault:  Viktoria Komova   Maria Paseka   Erika Fasana 
Uneven bars:  Anastasia Grishina   Komova  Diana Laura Bulimar 
Balance beam:  Komova  Larisa Iordache   Tess Moonen 
Floor:  Grishina  Iordache  Anastasia Sidorova

Ice hockey
Stanley Cup playoffs (all series best-of-7):
Eastern Conference Semifinals:
Game 2: (8) Montreal Canadiens 3, (4) Pittsburgh Penguins 1. Series tied 1–1.
Western Conference Semifinals:
Game 2: (1) San Jose Sharks 4, (5) Detroit Red Wings 3. Sharks lead series 2–0.

Motorcycle racing
Moto GP:
Spanish motorcycle Grand Prix in Jerez de la Frontera, Spain:
MotoGP: (1) Jorge Lorenzo  (Yamaha) (2) Dani Pedrosa  (Honda) (3) Valentino Rossi  (Yamaha)
Riders' championship standings (after 2 of 18 rounds): (1) Lorenzo 45 points (2) Rossi 41 (3) Pedrosa 29
Manufacturers' championship standings: (1) Yamaha 50 points (2) Honda 36 (3) Ducati 26
Moto2: (1) Toni Elías  (Moriwaki) (2) Shoya Tomizawa  (Suter) (3) Thomas Lüthi  (Moriwaki)
Riders' championship standings (after 2 of 17 rounds): (1) Tomizawa 45 points (2) Elías 38 (3) Lüthi 25
Manufacturers' championship standings: (1) Suter 45 points (2) Moriwaki 38 (3) MotoBi 21
125cc: (1) Pol Espargaró  (Derbi) (2) Nicolás Terol  (Aprilia) (3) Esteve Rabat  (Aprilia)
Riders' championship standings (after 2 of 17 rounds): (1) Terol 45 points (2) Espargaró 38 (3) Rabat 25
Manufacturers' championship standings: (1) Aprilia & Derbi 45 points (3) Honda 4

Rugby union
Heineken Cup Semi-finals:
Biarritz  18–7  Munster in Donostia-San Sebastián, Spain
Biarritz will play Toulouse in an all-French final at Stade de France on May 22.

Snooker
World Championship in Sheffield, England:
Final (best of 35 frames):
Neil Robertson  leads Graeme Dott  9–7

Tennis
ATP World Tour:
Internazionali BNL d'Italia in Rome, Italy:
Final: Rafael Nadal  def. David Ferrer  7–5, 6–2
Nadal wins his second title of the year and 38th of his career. He wins this tournament for the fifth time in six years.
Nadal ties Agassi's record of 17 Masters 1000 titles.
WTA Tour:
Porsche Tennis Grand Prix in Stuttgart, Germany:
Final: Justine Henin  def. Samantha Stosur  6–4, 2–6, 6–1
Henin wins the first title since her comeback from retirement and 42nd of her career. It's her 2nd win at the event, also winning in 2007.

Volleyball
Men's CEV Champions League Final Four in Łódź, Poland:
Third place play-off:  PGE Skra Bełchatów  3–1  ACH Volley Bled
Final:  Dynamo Moscow  0–3   Trentino BetClic
Trentino win the title for the second straight time.

May 1, 2010 (Saturday)

Auto racing
NASCAR Sprint Cup Series:
Crown Royal Presents the Heath Calhoun 400 in Richmond, Virginia
(1)  Kyle Busch (Toyota, Joe Gibbs Racing) (2)  Jeff Gordon (Chevrolet; Hendrick Motorsports) (3)  Kevin Harvick (Chevrolet; Richard Childress Racing)
Drivers' championship standings (after 10 of 36 races): (1) Harvick 1467 points (2)  Jimmie Johnson (Chevrolet, Hendrick Motorsports) 1457 (3) Busch 1358
IndyCar Series:
RoadRunner Turbo Indy 300 in Kansas City, Kansas
(1) Scott Dixon  (Chip Ganassi Racing) (2) Dario Franchitti  (Chip Ganassi Racing) (3) Tony Kanaan  (Andretti Autosport)
Drivers' championship standings (after 5 of 17 races): (1) Will Power  (Team Penske) 190 points (2) Dixon 164 (3) Hélio Castroneves  (Team Penske) 162
V8 Supercars:
City of Ipswich 300 in Queensland Raceway, Ipswich, Queensland
Race 9: (1) James Courtney  (Ford Falcon) (2) Craig Lowndes  (Holden Commodore) (3) Shane van Gisbergen  (Ford Falcon)
Drivers' championship standings (after 9 of 26 races): (1) Jamie Whincup  (Holden Commodore) 1191 points (2) Courtney 1017 (3) Mark Winterbottom  (Ford Falcon) 894

Basketball
 NBA Playoffs (best-of-7 series):
Eastern Conference Semifinals:
Game 1: Cleveland Cavaliers 101, Boston Celtics 93. Cavaliers lead series 1–0.

Chess
World Championship in Sofia, Bulgaria:
Game 6: Viswanathan Anand  (White) drew with Veselin Topalov  (Black)
Anand leads the series 3½–2½.

Cricket
ICC Men's World Twenty20 in West Indies:
Group C:  115/8 (20 overs),  116/3 (14.5 overs) in Gros Islet, St Lucia. India win by 7 wickets.
Group A:  172/3 (20 overs);  151/7 (20 overs) in Gros Islet, St Lucia. Pakistan win by 21 runs.

Cycling
UCI ProTour:
Tour de Romandie:
Stage 4:  Simon Špilak  4h 05' 25"  Peter Sagan  + 13"  Philippe Gilbert  + 13"
General classification: (1) Michael Rogers   14h 01' 50" (2) Alejandro Valverde  + 1" (3) Špilak  + 5"

Football (soccer)
 Coupe de France Final in Saint-Denis:
AS Monaco 0–1 (AET) Paris Saint-Germain
Paris Saint-Germain win the Cup for the eighth time.
 Welsh Cup Final in Llanelli:
Port Talbot Town 2–3 Bangor City
Bangor City win the Cup for the third straight year and eighth time overall.
 Fußball-Bundesliga, matchday 33 of 34:
(1) Bayern Munich 3–1 (16) Bochum
(2) Schalke 04 0–2 (3) Werder Bremen
Standings: Bayern Munich 67 points (goal difference +39), Schalke 64 (GD +22), Werder Bremen 60.
Bayern Munich all-but-mathematically secure the title because they have a vastly superior goal difference than Schalke. Both teams qualify for the Champions League Group stage.

Gymnastics
European Women's Artistic Gymnastics Championships in Birmingham, United Kingdom:
Seniors Team:

Horse racing
English Triple Crown:
2,000 Guineas Stakes in Newmarket, Suffolk:  Makfi (trainer: Mikel Delzangles, jockey: Christophe Lemaire)  Dick Turpin (trainer: Richard Hannon, Sr., jockey: Ryan Moore)  Canford Cliffs (trainer: Richard Hannon, jockey: Richard Hughes)
U.S. Triple Crown:
Kentucky Derby in Louisville:  Super Saver (trainer: Todd Pletcher, jockey: Calvin Borel)  Ice Box (trainer: Nick Zito, jockey: Jose Lezcano)  Paddy O'Prado (trainer: Dale Romans, jockey: Kent Desormeaux)
 Borel becomes the first jockey to win the race in consecutive years since Eddie Delahoussaye in 1982 and 1983, and the first ever to win three times in four years.

Ice hockey
Stanley Cup playoffs (all series best-of-7):
Eastern Conference Semifinals:
Game 1: (6) Boston Bruins 5, (7) Philadelphia Flyers 4 (OT). Bruins lead series 1–0.
Western Conference Semifinals:
Game 1: (3) Vancouver Canucks 5, (2) Chicago Blackhawks 1. Canucks lead series 1–0.

Rugby union
2011 Rugby World Cup qualifying:
2010 Asian Five Nations:
 13–71  in Daegu
Standings:  7 points (2 matches), Japan,  6 (1), Arabian Gulf 5 (2), Korea 0 (2).
Heineken Cup Semi-finals:
Toulouse  26–16  Leinster in Toulouse
Amlin Challenge Cup Semi-finals:
London Wasps  15–18  Cardiff Blues

Snooker
World Championship in Sheffield, England:
Semi-finals (best of 33 frames):
Neil Robertson  def. Ali Carter  17–12
Graeme Dott  def. Mark Selby  17–14

Tennis
WTA Tour:
Grand Prix SAR La Princesse Lalla Meryem in Fes, Morocco
Final: Iveta Benešová  def. Simona Halep  6–4, 6–2.
Benešová wins the second title of her career.

Volleyball
Men's CEV Champions League Final Four in Łódź, Poland:
Semifinals:
PGE Skra Bełchatów  1–3  Dynamo Moscow
ACH Volley Bled  1–3  Trentino BetClic

References

V